= List of video editing software =

The following is a list of video editing software.

The criterion for inclusion in this list is the ability to perform non-linear video editing. Most modern transcoding software supports transcoding a portion of a video clip, which would count as cropping and trimming. However, items in this article have one of the following conditions:

1. Can perform other non-linear video editing function such as montage or compositing
2. Can do the trimming or cropping without transcoding

== Free (libre) or open-source ==
The software listed in this section is either free software or open source, and may or may not be commercial.

=== Active and stable ===
- Avidemux (Linux, macOS, Windows)
- Losslesscut (Linux, macOS, Windows)
- Blender VSE (Linux, FreeBSD, macOS, Windows)
- Cinelerra (Linux, FreeBSD)
- FFmpeg (Linux, macOS, Windows) – CLI only; no visual feedback
- Flowblade (Linux)
- Kdenlive (Linux, FreeBSD, macOS, Windows)
- LiVES (BSD, IRIX, Linux, Solaris)
- ObscuraCam (Android)
- OpenShot (Linux, FreeBSD, macOS, Windows)
- Pitivi (Linux, FreeBSD)
- Shotcut (Linux, FreeBSD, macOS, Windows)

=== Inactive ===
- Kino (Linux, FreeBSD)
- VirtualDub (Windows)
- VideoLan Movie Creator (VLMC) (Linux, macOS, Windows)

== Proprietary (non-commercial) ==
The software listed in this section is proprietary, and freeware or freemium.

=== Active ===
- Clipchamp (Web app)
- DaVinci Resolve (macOS, Windows, Linux, iPadOS)
- elevate.io (Web app)
- Freemake Video Converter (Windows)
- iMovie (iOS, macOS)
- ivsEdits (Windows)
- Lightworks (Windows, Linux, macOS)
- VideoPad Home Edition (Windows, macOS, iPad, Android)
- VSDC Free Video Editor (Windows)
- WeVideo (Web app)
- YouTube Create (Android)

=== Discontinued ===
- Adobe Premiere Express (Web app)
- HTC Zoe/Video Highlights (HTC app)
- Pixorial (Web app)
- VideoThang (Windows)
- Microsoft Photos Legacy (Windows)
- Windows Movie Maker (Windows)

== Proprietary (commercial) ==
The software listed in this section is proprietary and commercial.

=== Active ===
- Adobe After Effects (macOS, Windows)
- Adobe Premiere Elements (macOS, Windows)
- Adobe Premiere Pro (macOS, Windows)
- Adobe Presenter Video Express (macOS, Windows) – Also screencast software
- Avid Media Composer (Windows, macOS)
- AVS Video Editor (Windows)
- Blackbird (macOS, Windows, Linux)
- Camtasia (Windows, macOS) – Also screencast software
- CapCut (Windows, macOS, iOS, Android)
- Corel VideoStudio (Windows)
- Cyberlink PowerDirector (Windows, macOS, iOS, Android)
- DaVinci Resolve Studio (macOS, Windows, Linux)
- Edius (Windows)
- Wondershare Filmora (Windows, macOS, iOS, Android)
- Final Cut Pro (macOS, iPadOS)
- Kaltura (Web app)
- Magix Movie Edit Pro (Windows)
- Media 100 Suite (macOS)
- muvee Reveal (Windows, macOS)
- Pinnacle Studio (Windows)
- Roxio Creator (Windows)
- Retouch4me Heal OFX, Dodge&Burn OFX, Color Match OFX (Windows, macOS)
- ScreenFlow (macOS)
- Vegas Pro (Windows) – previously Sony Vegas
- VideoPad Master's Edition (Windows, macOS, iPadOS, Android)
- Xedio (Windows)

=== Discontinued ===
- ArcSoft ShowBiz (Windows)
- Autodesk Smoke (macOS)
- Avid DS (Windows)
- Clesh (Java on OS X, Windows, Linux)
- Final Cut Express (OS X)
- LoiLoScope (Windows)
- MPEG Video Wizard DVD (Windows)
- Serif MoviePlus (Windows)
- Pinnacle Videospin (Windows)
- Video Toaster (Windows, hardware suite)
- Xpress Pro (Windows, OS X)

== See also ==
- Comparison of video editing software
- Comparison of video converters
- Photo slideshow software
- Video editing
