= Comparison of video editing software =

This is a comparison of non-linear video editing software applications. See also a more complete list of video editing software.

== General information ==
This table gives basic general information about the different editors:

=== Active ===
Program	Developer	Platform	Initial release	Latest release		License	Target audience
Program	Developer	Platform	Initial release	Version	Date	License	Target audience
Adobe Premiere Elements	Adobe Inc.	macOS	2004	2022	2022	Trialware	prosumer
Adobe Premiere Elements	Adobe Inc.	Windows	2004	2022	2022	Trialware	prosumer
Adobe Premiere Pro	Adobe Inc.	macOS	1991	26.0.1	2026-02-12	Commercial	professional
Adobe Premiere Pro	Adobe Inc.	Windows	1991	26.0.1	2026-02-12	Commercial	professional
Autodesk Flame	Autodesk	Linux	1993	2022	2022	Commercial	professional (vfx; finishing system)
Autodesk Flame	Autodesk	macOS	1993	2022	2022	Commercial	professional (vfx; finishing system)
Avid Media Composer	Avid	macOS	1989	2024.10	2024	Commercial	professional
Avid Media Composer	Avid	Windows	1989	2024.10	2024	Commercial	professional
Avid Media Composer First	Avid	macOS	2017	2021.9	2021	Freeware	professional
Avid Media Composer First	Avid	Windows	2017	2021.9	2021	Freeware	professional
Avidemux	Mean, Gruntster and Fahr	BSD		2.8.1	2022-09-21	GPL-2.0-or-later	basic
Avidemux	Mean, Gruntster and Fahr	Linux		2.8.1	2022-09-21	GPL-2.0-or-later	basic
Avidemux	Mean, Gruntster and Fahr	macOS		2.8.1	2022-09-21	GPL-2.0-or-later	basic
Avidemux	Mean, Gruntster and Fahr	Windows		2.8.1	2022-09-21	GPL-2.0-or-later	basic
AVS Video Editor	Online Media Technologies Ltd.	Windows	2003	9.7.3	2022	Commercial	prosumer
Blender (Note: VSE: Video Sequence Editor.)	Blender Foundation	Linux	2002	5.3	2026-11-10	GPL-2.0-or-later	professional
Blender	Blender Foundation	Irix	2002	5.3	2026-11-10	GPL-2.0-or-later	professional
Blender	Blender Foundation	macOS	2002	5.3	2026-11-10	GPL-2.0-or-later	professional
Blender	Blender Foundation	Solaris	2002	5.3	2026-11-10	GPL-2.0-or-later	professional
Blender	Blender Foundation	Windows	2002	5.3	2026-11-10	GPL-2.0-or-later	professional
Camtasia	TechSmith Corporation	Windows	2002	2025.2.5	2025-11-11	Trialware, Commercial	professional, prosumer
Camtasia	TechSmith Corporation	macOS	2002	2025.2.5	2025-11-11	Trialware, Commercial	professional, prosumer
Cinelerra	Heroine Virtual	Linux	2002	7.4	2021	GPL-2.0-or-later	professional
Cinelerra-GG Infinity	Open Source Community	Linux	2016 (Note: As Cinelerra 5.1.)	2025-10	2025-10-31	GPL-2.0-or-later	professional
Corel VideoStudio	Corel Corporation	Windows	1993 (Note: Under Ulead.)	VS 2021	2021	Trialware	prosumer
CyberLink PowerDirector	CyberLink	Windows	2001	20	2021	Commercial	prosumer
DaVinci Resolve	Blackmagic Design	Linux	2004	20.3.2	2026-02-12	Freeware, Commercial	professional
DaVinci Resolve	Blackmagic Design	macOS	2004	20.3.2	2026-02-12	Freeware, Commercial	professional
DaVinci Resolve	Blackmagic Design	Windows	2004	20.3.2	2026-02-12	Freeware, Commercial	professional
Final Cut Pro	Apple Inc.	macOS	2011	12.2	2026-01-10	Commercial	professional
Final Cut Pro	Apple Inc.	iPadOS	2023	3.2	2026-04-10	Commercial	professional
EDIUS	Grass Valley Canopus	Windows	2002	10.00	2020	Commercial	professional
elevate.io	Blackbird PLC	Web App	March 26, 2024	2026	2026	Freemium	prosumer
Flowblade	Open Source Community	Linux	2012	2.24.2	2026-05-29	GPL-3.0-or-later	prosumer
Blackbird	Blackbird PLC	Cross-platform (Note: JavaScript, Java, iOS, Android.)	2004	-	2020	Commercial	professional
iMovie	Apple Inc.	macOS	1999	10.4.6	2026-11-18	Commercial	prosumer
iMovie	Apple Inc.	iOS / iPadOS	2010	3.0.5	2024-12-16	Commercial	prosumer
ivsEdits	Interactive Video Systems	Windows	2008	5.0.607	2017	Freeware, Commercial	professional (small)?
Kdenlive	Open Source Community	BSD	2002	26.08.2	2026-10-13	GPL-2.0-or-later	prosumer
Kdenlive	Open Source Community	Linux	2002	26.08.2	2026-10-13	GPL-2.0-or-later	prosumer
Kdenlive	Open Source Community	macOS	2002	26.08.2	2026-10-13	GPL-2.0-or-later	prosumer
Kdenlive	Open Source Community	Windows	2002	26.08.2	2026-10-13	GPL-2.0-or-later	prosumer
Lightworks	LWKS	Linux	1989	2026.1	2026	Freeware, Commercial	professional
Lightworks	LWKS	macOS	1989	2026.1	2026	Freeware, Commercial	professional
Lightworks	LWKS	Windows	1989	2026.1	2026	Freeware, Commercial	professional
LiVES	Gabriel Finch and others	Linux	2002	3.2.0	2020-11-08	GPL-3.0-or-later	prosumer
LiVES	Gabriel Finch and others	Unix-like	2002	3.2.0	2020-11-08	GPL-3.0-or-later	prosumer
LosslessCut	Mikael Finstad	BSD	2016	3.70.2	2026-10-28	GPL-2.0-only	basic, GOP-boundaries
LosslessCut	Mikael Finstad	Linux	2016	3.70.2	2026-10-28	GPL-2.0-only	basic, GOP-boundaries
LosslessCut	Mikael Finstad	macOS	2016	3.70.2	2026-10-28	GPL-2.0-only	basic, GOP-boundaries
LosslessCut	Mikael Finstad	Windows	2016	3.70.2	2026-10-28	GPL-2.0-only	basic, GOP-boundaries
Magix Movie Edit Pro	Magix	Windows	2001 (Note: VideoDeluxe 1.0.)	2019	2021	Commercial	prosumer
Natron	Alexandre Gauthier; Frédéric Devernay	Linux	2014	2.5.0	2022-11-26	GPL-2.0-or-later	prosumer ? (vfx)
Natron	Alexandre Gauthier; Frédéric Devernay	macOS	2014	2.5.0	2022-11-26	GPL-2.0-or-later	prosumer ? (vfx)
Natron	Alexandre Gauthier; Frédéric Devernay	Windows	2014	2.5.0	2022-11-26	GPL-2.0-or-later	prosumer ? (vfx)
Nero Video	Nero AG	Windows	2002	2022	2021	Commercial	prosumer
OpenShot	Open Source Community	Linux	2008	4.1.1	2026-11-02	GPL-3.0-or-later	prosumer
OpenShot	Open Source Community	macOS	2008	4.1.1	2026-11-02	GPL-3.0-or-later	prosumer
OpenShot	Open Source Community	Windows	2008	4.1.1	2026-11-02	GPL-3.0-or-later	prosumer
Microsoft Photos Video Editor	Microsoft Corporation	Windows	2017	2021	2021	Freeware	basic
Pinnacle Studio	Pinnacle Systems	Windows	1999	25	2021	Commercial	prosumer
Pitivi	Open Source Community	Linux	2004	2023.03.0	2023-03-26	LGPL-2.1-or-later	prosumer (in development)
Shotcut	Meltytech, LLC	Linux	2011	26.11.15	2026-11-16	GPL-3.0-or-later	prosumer
Shotcut	Meltytech, LLC	macOS	2011	26.11.15	2026-11-16	GPL-3.0-or-later	prosumer
Shotcut	Meltytech, LLC	OpenBSD	2011	26.11.15	2026-11-16	GPL-3.0-or-later	prosumer
Shotcut	Meltytech, LLC	Windows	2011	26.11.15	2026-11-16	GPL-3.0-or-later	prosumer
Vegas Pro	Magix	Windows	1999	23	2025	Commercial	professional (small)
VideoPad	NCH Software	Android	2008	11.22	2022	Trialware	prosumer
VideoPad	NCH Software	iPad	2008	11.22	2022	Trialware	prosumer
VideoPad	NCH Software	iPhone	2008	11.22	2022	Trialware	prosumer
VideoPad	NCH Software	macOS	2008	11.22	2022	Trialware	prosumer
VideoPad	NCH Software	Windows	2008	11.22	2022	Trialware	prosumer
VSDC Free Video Editor	Flash-Intergro LLC	Windows	2008	9.1	2024	Freeware	prosumer

=== Discontinued / Inactive ===
Program	Developer	Platform	Initial release	Latest release		License	Target audience
Program	Developer	Platform	Initial release	Version	Date	License	Target audience
Windows Movie Maker	Microsoft	Windows	2000			Freeware	basic
VirtualDubMod	"Belgabor"	Windows	2002	1.5.10.3_b2550	2007	GPL-2.0-or-later	?
VideoThang	VideoThang LLC	Windows	2007	2.0.1	2008	Freeware	?
Avid Free DV	Avid	macOS	?	1.8.1	2006	Commercial	?
Avid Free DV	Avid	Windows	?	1.8.1	2006	Commercial	?
Final Cut Express	Apple Inc.	macOS	2003	4.0.1	2007	Commercial	prosumer
Final Cut Pro	Apple Inc.	macOS	1999	7.0.3	2009	Commercial	professional
Pinnacle Videospin	Avid	Windows	2009	2.0	2009	Freeware	?
Ulead MediaStudio Pro	Ulead Systems (Note: Now Corel.)	Windows	?	8.1	2006	Commercial	?
Serif MoviePlus	Serif (Europe) Ltd	Windows	2000	X6	2012	Commercial	prosumer (basic)
MPEG Video Wizard DVD	Womble Multimedia	Windows	?	5.0.1.105	2012	Trialware	prosumer
Xpress Pro	Avid	macOS	2003	5.8	?	Commercial	?
Xpress Pro	Avid	Windows	2003	5.8	?	Commercial	?
Kino	Open Source Community	BSD	2000			GPL-2.0-or-later	?
Kino	Open Source Community	Linux	2000			GPL-2.0-or-later	?
MainActor	MainConcept	Linux	2004	5.5	2007	Commercial	?
MainActor	MainConcept	Windows	2004	5.5	2007	Commercial	?
EditDV	Radius	macOS	1997	3.0	2002	Commercial	?
EditDV	Radius	Windows	1997	3.0	2002	Commercial	?
VirtualDub	Avery Lee	Windows	2000	1.10.4 stable	2013	GPL-2.0-or-later	basic
Cinelerra-CV	Open Source Community	Linux	2003?	2.3	2015	GPL-2.0-or-later	professional
Autodesk Smoke	Autodesk	macOS	?	2021	2021	Commercial	professional (vfx; finishing system)
Vegas Movie Studio	Magix	Windows	2000	17	2020	Commercial	prosumer

==== Definition ====
- professional: used for full length Hollywood movies;
- professional (small): mainly used for paid commercials, short films or podcasts/YouTube channels;
- prosumer: Mainly targeting private use, anything that can do more than just trimming a film;
- basic: trimming a film;

== System requirements ==
This table lists the operating systems that different editors can run on without emulation, as well as other system requirements. Note that minimum system requirements are listed; some features, like high-definition (HD) support, may be unavailable with these specifications.

	Windows	macOS	Unix-like	Processor	RAM	VRAM	HDD
Adobe Premiere Pro CC	Yes	Yes	No	Skylake or later	8 GB	2 GB	8 GB
Adobe Premiere Elements	Yes	Yes (as of v9)	No	2 GHz+ with SSE2 support	2 GB		4.5 GB
Avid Media Composer	Yes	Yes	Yes	SSE 4.1 support	16 GB		?
Avidemux	Yes	Yes	Yes	?	?		?
AVS Video Editor	Yes	No	No	Intel / AMD compatible at 2500 MHz or higher	1 GB		1 GB
Blender (VSE : Video Sequence Editor)	Yes	Yes	Yes	2 GHz+ with SSE2 support	2 GB	512 MB	?
Cinelerra	No	No	Yes	x86-64 compatible processor	256 MB		0.25 GB
Cinelerra-GG Infinity	No	No	Yes	x86-64 compatible processor, recommended minimum: 2 GHz, 4 cores	8 GB recommended for HD editing		0.25 GB
Corel VideoStudio	Yes	No	No	3.0 GHz	4 GB	256 MB	8 GB
DaVinci Resolve	Yes	Yes	Yes	Modern Intel/AMD/Apple silicon processor	16 GB DDR4, 32 GB DDR4 when using Fusion	2 GB GDDR6	3.5 GB
EDIUS	Yes	No	No	Intel Core 2 or later with SSSE3 support	1 GB	512 MB	6 GB
Final Cut Pro X	No	Yes	No	?	4 GB	256 MB	3.8 GB
Flowblade	No	No	Yes	x86-64 compatible processor	?		2.7 GB
Blackbird	Yes	Yes	Yes	N/A	256 MB		Any
iMovie	No	Included	No	Intel based Macs or iPhone 4 or later	1 GB		5 GB
Kdenlive	Yes	Yes	Yes	600 MHz	256 MB		1 GB
Lightworks	Yes	Yes	Yes	Intel Core Duo, Intel Xeon or AMD processor	2 GB		200 MB
LiVES	No	Yes	Yes	800 MHz	128 MB		10 GB
Magix Movie Edit Pro	Yes	No	No	Dual core processor with 2.0 GHz	1 GB		2 GB
MPEG Video Wizard DVD	Yes	No	No	233 MHz	32 MB		20 MB
Nero Multimedia Suite	Yes	No	No	2 GHz AMD or Intel processor	512 MB (1 GB for Windows Vista or Windows 7); 2 GB when editing HD		5 GB
OpenShot Video Editor	Yes	Yes	Yes		4 GB (16 GB recommended)		1 GB
Pinnacle Studio	Yes	No	No	1.8 GHz	1 GB		1.7 GB
Pitivi	No	No	Yes	?	?		2 MB
Shotcut	Yes	Yes	Yes	2 GHz AMD or Intel processor	2GB / 4 GB when editing HD		1 GB
Vegas Pro	Yes	No	No	2.0 GHz	1.0 GB		400 MB
VideoPad	Yes	Yes	No	multicore x86 compatible processor	1GB		Any
VirtualDubMod	Yes	No	No	?	?	?	?
VSDC Free Video Editor	Yes	No	No	1.5 GHz or higher, Intel or AMD or compatible processor	512 Mb for the program		
	Windows	macOS	Unix	Processor	RAM	VRAM	HDD

"Unix" includes the similar Linux, BSD and Unix-like operating systems.

== High-definition/High-resolution import ==
The table below indicates the ability of each program to import various high-defition (HD) or high-resolution video formats for editing.

	DVCPRO HD	HD uncompressed	AVCHD	XDCAM HD	HDV	AVC-Intra	XAVC	DNxHD	DNxHR	DNx uncompressed	ProRes	ProRes RAW	R3D	ArriRaw	X-OCN	AV1
Adobe Premiere Pro	Yes	Yes	Yes	Yes	Yes	Yes	Yes	Yes	Yes	?	Yes	?	Yes	Yes	Yes	?
Adobe Premiere Elements	No	No	Yes (As of 7.0)	?	Yes	?	?	?	?	?	?	?	?	?	?	?
Avid Media Composer	Yes	Yes	Yes	Yes	Yes	Yes	Yes	Yes	Yes	Yes	Yes	?	Yes	Yes	?	?
Avidemux	?	?	?	?	?	?	?	?	?	?	?	?	?	?	?	Yes
AVS Video Editor	?	Yes	Yes	?	Yes	?	?	?	?	?	?	?	?	?	?	Yes (Quick Sync and CUDA for decoding)
Blender	?	Yes	Yes	?	?	?	?	?	?	?	?	?	No	?	?	?
Cinelerra	Yes	Yes	No	Yes	Yes	Yes	?	Yes	?	?	?	?	No	?	?	
Cinelerra-GG Infinity	Yes	Yes	Yes	Yes	Yes	Yes	?	Yes	Yes	?	Yes	?	No	?	?	Yes
DaVinci Resolve	Mac with Final Cut; Pro X	Yes	Yes	Yes	Mac with Final Cut Pro X	Mac with Final Cut; Pro X	Yes	Yes	Yes	16 or later	Yes	?	Yes	Yes	Yes	?
EDIUS	Yes	Yes	Yes	Yes	Yes	Yes	?	?	?	?	Yes	Yes	?	?	?	?
Final Cut Pro X	Yes	Yes	Yes	Yes	Yes	Yes	Yes	Partial (3rd party via codec install)	?	?	Yes	Yes	Yes	?	?	?
Blackbird	Yes	Yes	?	?	?	?	?	?	?	?	?	?	?	?	?	?
iMovie	Yes (3rd party)	No	Yes	?	?	?	?	?	?	?	?	?	?	?	?	?
Lightworks	Yes	Yes	Yes (as of Pro 11)	Yes (as of Pro 11)	Yes	Yes (as of Pro 11)	?	Yes (3rd party)	?	?	?	?	Yes (as of Pro 11)	?	?	?
LiVES	?	Yes	?	?	Yes	?	?	?	?	?	?	?	?	?	?	?
Kdenlive	Yes	Yes	Yes	Yes	Yes	Yes	?	Yes	?	?	Yes	?	No	?	?	?
Magix Movie Edit Pro	No	?	Yes	?	Yes	No	?	?	?	?	?	?	?	?	?	?
MPEG Video Wizard DVD	?	?	No	?	Yes	?	?	?	?	?	?	?	?	?	?	?
Nero Video	No	Yes	Yes	No	Yes	Yes	?	No	?	?	?	?	No	?	?	?
OpenShot Video Editor	Yes	Yes	Yes	Yes	Yes	Yes	?	Yes	?	?	?	?	No	?	?	?
Pinnacle Studio	No	No	Yes	?	Yes	?	?	?	?	?	?	?	?	?	?	?
Pitivi	Yes	Yes	Yes	Yes	Yes	Yes	?	Yes	?	?	?	?	?	?	?	?
Shotcut	?	?	?	?	?	?	?	?	?	?	?	?	?	?	?	?
Corel VideoStudio	?	Yes	Yes	?	?	?	?	?	?	?	?	?	?	?	?	?
Vegas Pro	Yes (3rd party)	Yes	Yes	Yes	Yes	?	Yes	Yes (3rd party)	?	?	Yes	?	Yes (as of Pro 9)	?	?	?
VideoPad	Yes	No	Yes	Yes	Yes	Yes	?	Yes	?	?	?	?	Yes	?	?	?
VirtualDub	Yes	Yes	Yes	Yes	Yes	Yes	?	Yes	?	?	?	?	Yes	?	?	?
VSDC Free Video Editor	Yes	Yes	Yes	Yes	Yes	Yes	?	Yes	?	?	?	?	Yes	?	?	?
WeVideo	Yes	?	Yes	Yes	Yes	?	?	?	?	?	?	?	?	?	?	?
Windows Live Movie Maker	No	?	Yes	?	Yes	?	?	?	?	?	?	?	?	?	?	?
	DVCPRO HD	HD uncompressed	AVCHD	XDCAM HD	HDV	AVC-Intra	XAVC	DNxHD	DNxHR	DNx uncompressed	ProRes	ProRes RAW	R3D	ArriRaw	X-OCN	AV1

== Feature set ==
	High-definition video	Non-destructive editing	Multitrack editing	Full-screen playback	Storyboard mode	Video tracks	Audio tracks / max channels	Linear timecode display	GPGPU with OpenCL acceleration
Adobe Premiere Pro	Yes	Yes	Yes	Yes, By hitting ctrl+~ (CS6 only)	Yes	Unlimited	Unlimited	Yes	Yes
Adobe Premiere Elements	Yes	Yes	Yes	Yes	Yes	Unlimited	Unlimited	Yes	?
Avid Media Composer	Yes	Yes	?	Yes	Yes	24 tracks, unlimited layers	24 tracks, unlimited layers	Yes	?
Avidemux	Yes	Yes	?	?	?	1	2 / ?	?	Yes
AVS Video Editor	Yes	Yes	?	Yes	Yes	1	1+	Yes	Yes (Quick Sync for decoding/encoding, CUDA for decoding)
Blender (VSE : Video Sequence Editor)	Yes	Yes	Yes	Yes	Yes	128 channels (combined with audio)	128 channels (combined with video)	Yes	Yes
Cinelerra	Yes (any resolution)	Yes	Yes	Yes	No	Unlimited	Unlimited / 16	Yes	?
Cinelerra-GG Infinity	Yes max 8K	Yes	Yes	Yes	No	Unlimited	Unlimited / 16	Yes	Some formats, using VAAPI/VDPAU/CUDA for decoding/encoding
DaVinci Resolve	Yes	Yes	Yes	Yes	Yes	Unlimited	Unlimited	Yes	Yes
EDIUS	Yes	Yes	Yes	Yes, on both PC & TV monitors in realtime	No	unlimited realtime layers	unlimited realtime layers	Yes	?
Final Cut Pro X	Yes	Yes	?	?	?	?	?	?	?
Blackbird	Input only	Yes	Yes	Yes	Yes	18	36	Yes	?
iMovie	Yes	Yes	?	Yes	Yes	2	6	Yes	?
Kdenlive	Yes	Yes	Yes	Yes	Yes	Unlimited	Unlimited	Yes	Planned through MLT
Lightworks	Yes	Yes	?	Yes	Yes	Unlimited	Unlimited	Yes	Planned
LiVES	Yes (any resolution)	Yes (multitrack mode)	?	Yes (on first, second or all monitors, configurable)	No	Unlimited	audio per video track + backing audio / 2 channels	Yes	?
Magix Movie Edit Pro	Yes	Yes	?	Yes	Yes	32/99 (Plus/Premium)	each track may contain audio and video	?	Yes
MPEG Video Wizard DVD	Yes	Yes	?	Yes	Yes	1	3	Yes	?
Nero Video	Yes	Yes	?	Yes	Yes	Unlimited	Yes	Yes	Yes (CUDA)
OpenShot Video Editor	Yes	Yes	Yes	No	No	Unlimited	Unlimited	Yes	?
Pinnacle Studio	Yes	Yes	Yes	Yes	Yes	Unlimited	Unlimited	Yes	?
Pitivi	Yes	Yes	?	Yes	No	Unlimited	Unlimited	Yes	?
Shotcut	?	Yes	Yes	?	Yes	?	?	?	Yes (Quick Sync)
Corel VideoStudio	Yes	Yes	Yes	Yes	Yes	7	9	Yes	Yes (CUDA and Quick Sync)
Vegas Pro	Yes (any resolution)	Yes	Yes	Yes	Yes	Unlimited	Unlimited/Max Channel 16	Yes	Yes (as of 11)
VideoPad	Yes	Yes	Yes	Yes	Yes	Unlimited	Unlimited	?	Planned
VirtualDub	Yes	Yes	No	No	No	1	1	Yes	?
VSDC Free Video Editor	Yes	Yes	Yes	Yes	Yes	Unlimited	Unlimited	Yes	Yes
WeVideo	Yes	Yes	?	Yes	Yes	Unlimited	Unlimited	No	?
Windows Live Movie Maker	Yes	Yes	No	Yes	Yes	1	2	?	?
	High-definition video	Non-destructive editing	Multitrack editing	Full-screen playback	Storyboard mode	Video tracks	Audio tracks	Linear timecode display	GPGPU with OpenCL acceleration

== Output options ==
Please note that recording to Blu-ray does not imply 1080@50p/60p . Most only support up to 1080i 25/30 frames per second recording. Also not all formats can be output.

	DVD	High-definition video	Smartphone	QuickTime	Windows Media	MPEG-4	XML/EDL	Print to tape	Web, not hosted	Web, hosted	Podcasting
Adobe Premiere Pro	Yes	Yes (Blu-ray)	Yes	Yes	Yes	Yes	Yes	Yes	Yes	Yes	?
Adobe Premiere Elements	Yes	Yes (Blu-ray)	Yes	Yes	Yes	Yes	No	Yes	Yes	Yes	Yes
Avid Media Composer	?	Yes	?	?	?	?	Yes	?	?	?	?
Avidemux	Yes	Yes	No	?	?	Yes	Yes	?	?	?	?
AVS Video Editor	Yes	Yes (Blu-ray)	Yes	Yes	Yes	Yes	No	No	Yes	Yes	No
Blender (VSE : Video Sequence Editor)	Yes	Yes	?	Yes	?	Yes	Yes	No	?	?	?
Cinelerra	Yes	Yes	Yes	Yes	Yes	Yes	Yes	No	Yes	No	Yes
Cinelerra-GG Infinity	Yes	Yes max 8K	Yes	Yes	Yes	Yes	Yes CMX3600	No	Yes	No	Yes
EDIUS	Yes	Yes	?	Yes	Yes	Yes	Yes	Yes	Yes	No	?
Final Cut Pro X	Yes	Yes	Yes	Yes	?	Yes	Yes	?	?	?	?
Flowblade	Yes	Yes	?	?	?	?	?	?	?	?	?
Blackbird	No	Yes	Yes	Yes (MPEG 2)	Yes (MPEG 2)	?	Yes	No	Yes	Yes	Yes
iMovie	Yes	Yes	Yes	Yes	Yes (3rd party)	Yes	Yes	Yes	Yes	Yes (with .Mac)	Yes
Kdenlive	Yes	Yes	Yes	Yes	Yes	Yes	Yes	Yes	Yes	Yes	?
Lightworks	Yes	Yes (max 720p in free version)	?	Yes (only in Pro 11)	?	Yes (only in Pro 11)	?	?	?	?	?
LiVES	Yes	Yes (AVCHD, Blu-ray)	Yes	Yes	Yes	Yes	No	No	Yes	No	?
Magix Movie Edit Pro	Yes	Yes (AVCHD, Blu-ray)	Yes	Yes	Yes	Yes	No	?	Yes	No	?
MPEG Video Wizard DVD	Yes	Yes	?	Yes	No	Yes	No	No	No	No	Yes
Nero Video	Yes	Yes (AVCHD, Blu-ray)	Yes	No	Yes	Yes	No	Yes	Yes	Yes	No
OpenShot Video Editor	Yes	Yes	Yes	Yes	Yes	Yes	Yes	Yes	Yes	Yes	Yes
Pinnacle Studio	Yes	Yes	Yes	Yes	Yes	Yes	No	Yes	Yes	Yes	Yes
Pitivi	Yes	Yes	?	Yes	Yes	Yes	?	?	No	No	?
Shotcut	?	?	?	?	?	?	?	?	?	?	?
Corel VideoStudio	Yes	Yes	Yes (via plug-in)	Yes	Yes	Yes	No	Yes	Yes	Yes (with DropShot)	?
Vegas Pro	Yes	Yes (Blu-ray)	No	Yes	Yes	Yes	Yes	Yes	Yes	No	?
VideoPad	Yes	Yes	Yes	Yes	Yes	Yes	No	No	Yes	Yes	No
VirtualDub	No	No	Yes (Via passthru)	No	No	Yes	No	No	Yes (Via passthru)	No	No
VSDC Free Video Editor	Yes	Yes	Yes	Yes	Yes	Yes	No	No	Yes	Yes	No
WeVideo	No	Yes	Yes	No	No	Yes	No	No	No	Yes	No
Windows Live Movie Maker	Yes	Yes	Yes	No	Yes	No	No	No	Yes	No	No
	DVD	High-definition video	Smartphone	QuickTime	Windows Media	MPEG-4	XML/EDL	Print to tape	Web, not hosted	Web, hosted	Podcasting

== See also ==
- List of video editing software
- Comparison of video converters
- Photo slideshow software
- Non-linear editing
- Comparison of DVD ripper software
