= Showbiz =

Showbiz is a vernacular term for show business.

Showbiz may also refer to:

== Music ==
- Showbiz (Muse album), 1999, or the title track
- Showbiz (Cud album), 1994
- Showbiz!, a 2025 album by Mike, or the title track
- Showbiz and A.G., an American hip hop duo
- Grant Showbiz, a British record producer and live sound recordist
- "Showbiz (The Battle)", a 2004 single by M. Pokora
- "Showbiz", a song by Helen Reddy from the 1974 album Free and Easy
- "Showbiz", a song by Previous Industries from the 2024 album Service Merchandise
- "Show Biz Kids", a song by Steely Dan from the 1973 album Countdown to Ecstacy

== Other uses ==
- Showbiz (game), a board game published in 1984
- ArcSoft ShowBiz, a video editor for the Windows operating system
- Showbiz (film), a Hindi film directed by Raju Khan
- Showbiz name or stage name, a pseudonym used by performers and entertainers
- ShowBiz Pizza Place, an American restaurant chain popular in the 1980s

== See also ==
- Show business (disambiguation)
- Showbiz411, an American entertainment industry news and film review site written by Roger Friedman
