= VPX (disambiguation) =

VPX is a computer bus standard.

VPX may also refer to:

- Vpx, Viral Protein X, a protein
- VPX Sports, and VPX, brand names of Vital Pharmaceuticals
- Victorian Power Exchange, established by the Government of Victoria, Australia
- VPX, video technology by NewBlue
- Vodafone VPx, see HTC Blue Angel

== See also ==
- OpenVPX, an Industry Working Group of defense contractors
