= Cinelerra =

Video editing software

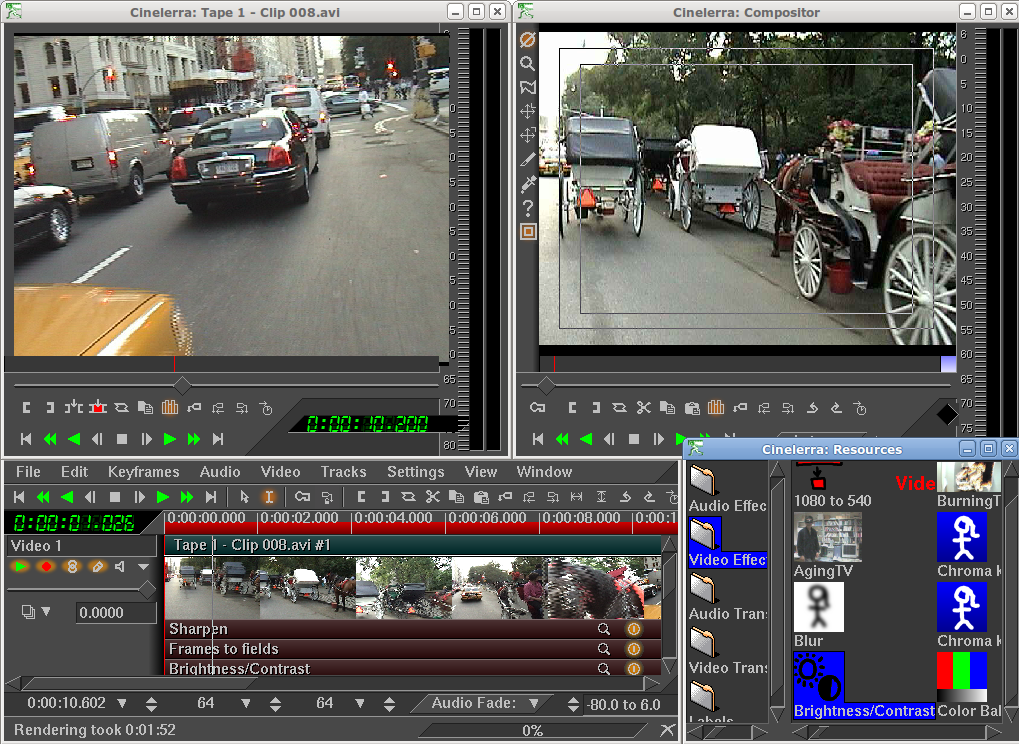
Cinelerra 2.1 being used to edit footage in a video project

Cinelerra is a video editing and track-based digital compositing program (an NLE, Non-Linear Editor) designed for Linux. It is a free software distributed under the open source GNU General Public License. In addition to editing, it supports advanced composition operations such as keying and mattes, including a title generator, many effects to edit video and audio, keyframe automation, and many other professional functions depending on the variant. It processes audio in 64 floating-point form. Video is processed in RGBA or YUVA color spaces, in 16-bit integer or floating-point form. It is resolution and image refresh rate independent. The HV & GG variants support up to 8K video. The GG variant can also create DVDs and Blu-rays.

== History ==
In 1996 Adam Williams of Heroine Virtual, lead developer of Cinelerra, released a Unix audio editor called Broadcast 1.0 which could handle 2G audio files. In 1997 Broadcast 2.0 was released, still audio only but unlimited tracks. 1999 saw Broadcast2000, which included video. Around 2001 Broadcast 2000 supported MPEG-2, VOB and Quicktimemovies. See the History of Cinelerra versions section for more detail.

Because of UI limitations, Williams rewrote significant parts and released that as Cinelerra on August 12, 2002, while Broadcast2000 was withdrawn by Heroine Virtual in September 2001. Cinelerra became the first 64-bit media production application when it was rewritten to work with the AMD Opteron processor in June 2003 and was presented at SIGGRAPH 2004 in San Diego. Since then, many versions have been released.

The original version is still being produced by Williams. There have been several spin-offs made by the open source community, Cinelerra-GG and Cinelerra-CVE (a fork of Cinelerra-CV) are presently under active development. For a complete overview of versions, see the Variants section below. Even though the different variants look the same, there are considerable functional differences between them.

An overview of the different variants that released more than one version:

| Cinelerra variant | First version (and release date) | Last version (and release date) | Platforms (ready-to-run program) | New releases | Supported GUI languages |
|---|---|---|---|---|---|
| HV | 1.0.0 (2002-08-12) | 10.1 (2026-03-21) | Ubuntu | Yearly | DE, EN, ES, EU, FR, IT, NB, SL, PT_BR |
| CV | 1.1.5 (2003-04-29) | 2.3 (2015-08-13) | Old repos of Linux distros | Frozen | DE, EN, ES, EU, FR, IT, NB, SL, PT_BR, RU |
| GG Infinity | 5.1 (2016-03-31) | 2026-10 (2026-10-31) | Current repos of Linux distros / Linux AppImage | Monthly | DE, EN, ES, EU, FR, IT, NB, SL, PT, RU, EL, HI, HU, JA, KO, UK, VI, ZH |

== Interface ==
Cinelerra's interface is similar to that of other Non-linear editing systems, such as Adobe Premiere Pro, Final Cut Pro, and Avid Media Composer. However, because it includes a compositing engine, it may also be likened to compositing software such as Adobe After Effects, Smoke on Linux or Shake. The user is by default presented with four windows (clockwise from lower left in picture at top right):

1. The timeline, which gives the user a time-based view of all video and audio tracks in the project, as well as keyframe data for e.g. camera movement, effects, or opacity.
2. The viewer, which gives the user a method of "scrubbing" (manually moving the playhead forwards or backwards to locate a specific cue or word) through footage.
3. The compositor, which presents the user with a view of the final project as it would look when rendered. The compositor is interactive in that it allows the user to adjust the positions of video objects; it also updates in response to user input.
4. The resource window, which presents the user with a view of all audio and video resources in the project, as well as available audio and video effects and transitions.

Cinelerra uses its own widget toolkit Guicast (the Cinelerra GUI library), not conforming to the human interface guidelines of major Linux desktops such as GNOME and KDE. This has the advantage that it looks and works the same no matter which distribution or desktop is used, and removes being dependent on a changing version of the desktop (for instance GNOME 2 / GNOME 3). Guicast was written by Adam Williams. The repository of Guicast is available on GitHub

"The journey began in 1997 with a 1st toolkit for Broadcast 1.0 called BCBase. The mane alternatives at the time were Xaw, TK, Motif, XView. They were really bad. GTK & Qt were just getting started. Qt was still royalty based. It was renamed Guicast to be more general purpose but it remained tied to video editing. 25 years later, the alternatives are still really bad ..."

A version of Cinelerra-gg with a different GUI is under development. It is available as an alpha release on the Cinellera-gg download site..

== Usage and awards ==
Cinelerra has gained ground among some Linux enthusiasts looking for a native video editing system. Professional use was mostly promoted by Linux Media Arts, which sold an integrated hardware and software package for video production that includes Cinelerra. However, the company does not seem to be active in the Cinelerra field anymore.

At the National Association of Broadcasters' 2004 Electronic Media Show, Cinelerra received Bob Turner's "Making the Cut" award, given to "the best and most exciting post-production products seen at the convention".

In December 2018 Libre Graphics World included Cinelerra in its comparison of the sustainability of video editors for Linux.

== Cinelerra.org ==
The cinelerra.org website was originally registered by a member of Cinelerra-CV Community Richard Baverstock on Jan 10 2004. Around January 2014 the Cinelerra-CV Community overlooked the renewal of cinelerra.org. The domain was then taken over by a different project managed by Michael Collins, one of the founders of Cinelerra. The project was following commercial interests, aiming at offering professional support to its users. It was organized to merge all existing Cinelerra projects while also providing additional fixes and enhancements.

Since early 2015, Cinelerra.org has an open Git repository on Google Code for analysis and for input; however, that platform is read-only since 2015-08-24. At the present time, this repository does not contain source code. The project released a studio centric version 5.0 of Cinelerra. The goal of Cinelerra.org was to develop a more professional value to the product as of 2016.

In January 2016, the main developer of the project William Morrow working behind cinelerra.org ("Good Guy") left cinelerra.org, continuing to work on Cinelerra 5.0, then on Cinelerra-GG 5.1 with help from the Cinelerra-CV Community.

At the present time, Cinelerra.org supports Cinelerra-HV work. Its website links in the download section to both the HV and GG versions.

== Variants ==
=== Cinelerra-HV ===
Cinelerra
- Original author: Adam Williams
- Developer: Heroine Virtual
- Release: August 12, 2002; 24 years ago
- Stable release: 10.1 / March 21, 2026; 7 months ago
- Written in: C, C++
- Operating system: Linux
- Type: Video editing software
- License: GPL-2.0-or-later
- Website: heroinewarrior.com
- Repository: github.com/heroineworshiper/hvirtual; github.com/heroineworshiper/hvirtual_bin

Heroine Virtual (HV), the producer of the original Cinelerra, generates a new release of Cinelerra annually, available as source code and a binary for Ubuntu in the HV-repo on SourceForge and as source code in the HV-repo on GitHub. A new rolling repository for Cinelerra-HV was published on Feb. 2024 in the HV-repo on GitHub. This repo contains the binaries (continuous builds) for Ubuntu. These continuous builds contain the latest features and bug fixes for testing purposes. After each update to the source code repository on GH, Adam Williams builds/provides a binary file for testing (in the binary repo on GH).

HV has used SourceForge since the beginning (first source 2001-09-09), but does not react to bugs, patches and feature requests on that platform. The source on SourceForge is only made available as complete download for each release. Intermediate access to source files on SF is not possible. Any bugs and usability issues found and resolved by the community that are submitted to Heroine Virtual often result in no immediate response, and it is not until a new release that there is any indication that Heroine Virtual has incorporated these changes.

Intermediate access to source files as well as an immediate response is possible in the HV-repo on GitHub. The developer responds to bug reports, requests for fixes or additional features through this platform. Use GitHub Issues to track ideas, feedback, bugs, or usability issues.

To distinguish between the different variants of the software, the releases made by Heroine Virtual are also called Cinelerra-HV.

=== Cinelerra-CV / Cinelerra-CVE ===
Cinelerra-CV
- Developer: Cinelerra-CV Community
- Stable release: 2.3 / August 13, 2015; 11 years ago
- Written in: C++
- Operating system: Linux
- Type: Video editing software
- License: GPL-2.0-or-later
- Website: cinelerra-cv.wikidot.com
- Repository: github.com/cinelerra-cv-team/cinelerra-cv

Because of both the latency in development and the distribution-specific nature of the original Cinelerra from Heroine Virtual, a group of software developers created their own version of Cinelerra referred to as Cinelerra-CV (where CV stands for Community Version).

Cinelerra-CV allows the community to contribute to an open repository where changes to the code are accessible to everyone. Mailing list exist where more experienced users and developers can provide support to less experienced users, and developers can hold technical discussions. Cinelerra-CV is also packaged for a wider range of distributions. It also has a different compilation system: system libraries are used extensively, and the autoconf/automake tools are used to configure the compilation system.

Although Cinelerra-CV may technically be called a fork, the relationship between Heroine Virtual and Cinelerra-CV is rather friendly. Heroine Virtual at times contributes to discussions on the mailing lists, and incorporates many of the changes made in the repository.

Heroine Virtual posted the following message on their website describing the relationship:

What you'll find here is the heroinewarrior version of Cinelerra. This is the version that supports what we need to do at Heroine Virtual Ltd. and is the same tree that was started in 1997. As time passes and new students come and go from the Linux scene, new forks of Cinelerra emerge that are more suited to the community but not what Heroine Virtual Ltd. needs. Today you'll probably find the cinelerra-cv.org fork more useful. They allow certain parts of our fork into their fork while contributing anything they want while we allow certain parts of their fork into our fork while contributing anything we want".

Up until Cinelerra 2.1 the versioning of Cinelerra-CV followed that of Heroine Virtual. After Heroine Virtual released a new version, Cinelerra-CV merged relevant code from the new HV variant and into their variant. CV was appended to the end of the version number to indicate the community version (For example, after the 2.1 merger the CV version was labeled 2.1CV).

Starting with release 2.2, Cinelerra-CV uses its own versioning scheme, but still merges code from Cinelerra-HV. Following the 26th June 2019, the official web pages were taken offline and the URL redirects to the website for Cinelerra-GG.

The new official site of Cinelerra-CV was published on July 1 2020. The source code of Cinelerra-CV is available from the new official repo on GitHub . The new official Cinelerra-CV Mailing List is available here. The Cinelerra-CV Mailing list from 2001 is archived. The complete collection of old (previous) Cinelerra-CV Mailing List archives is referenced/linked from this page of the new official Cinelerra-CV site.

Cinelerra-CVE is an experimental fork of Cinelerra-CV, created by the main Cinelerra-CV developer (2012-2018) Einar Rünkaru in June 2008 and published in the middle of March 2010:

The main difference between Cinelerra-CVE and (Cinelerra-HV, Cinelerra-CV, Cinelerra-GG) is attempt to use (in Cinelerra-CVE) seconds as timebase instead of framerate and samplerate. An implementation of PTS based timing enables to edit media with variable framerate and get rid of assumption that audio and video start simultaneously... Big plan is to get Cinelerra-CVE to the level where a user can mix (in Cinelerra) media from different origins, with different frame rates, resolutions, sample rates, color spaces and get the result he/she needs. If the result is not satisfying, the user will have the tools to tweak the project until the result is perfect.

=== Lumiera ===
In April 2008, the Cinelerra community engaged into a rework and rewrite of the Community Version. Initially called Cinelerra3, it was soon separated into an independent project. The name Lumiera was chosen by the community through a collaborative selection and vote.

The project maintained active development ever since, yet there is no usable application as of October 2023, since the core team decided to build the engine and infrastructure bottom-up, while the UI is developed to match the capabilities of the core.

Lumiera is not a fork of Cinelerra. Not a single line of Cinelerra code is now used in Lumiera. Lumiera is built from scratch, starting with the engine core, yet pursuing a similar vision and expanding on some of the ideas and approaches found in Cinelerra. The project grew out of an effort to amend long standing problems present in the Cinelerra-CV code base at that time. The actual technology however is built ground-up, using contemporary methods.

The project remains in a pre-alpha status of development with a yearly development news update Lumiera news.

Lumiera's native interface will be written in GTK+, although other interfaces will be possible, since the user interface is loaded as a plug-in.

The goal of the Lumiera project is to build a free open-source nonlinear video editing and compositing application (NLE).

=== Cinelerra-GG Infinity ===
Cinelerra-GG Infinity
- Developer: Cinelerra-GG community
- Release: March 31, 2016; 10 years ago
- Stable release: 2026-10 / October 31, 2026; 2 days ago
- Written in: C++
- Operating system: Linux
- Type: Video editing software
- License: GPL-2.0-or-later, external plug-ins may differ
- Website: cinelerra-gg.org
- Repository: git.cinelerra-gg.org

Cinelerra-GG, a separate variant of Cinelerra by William Morrow and Phyllis Smith, started with merged code from Cinelerra-HV and Cinelerra-CV but quickly grew. It was first developed within Cinelerra.org (Cinelerra 4.6-mod, Cinelerra 5.0), then within the site of Cinelerra-cv.org (Cinelerra 5.0, Cinelerra 5.1, Cinelerra GG 5.1), and since December 2018 with its own website cinelerra-gg.org as Cinelerra-GG Infinity. William died on 11/2020 during a bicycle ride, but Phyllis continues to work on Cinelerra-GG. A new developer is now making frequent updates.

An important issue is that Cinelerra-GG reduces reliance on system libraries by including them where practical, like ffmpeg and OpenEXR. This makes it more predictable on different platforms, and also allows it to pick up new versions before the platform does.

Cinelerra-GG is determined to get as close as possible to what can be expected from professional level video editing software (NLE) for the Linux platform.

Its software features include support for recent versions of ffmpeg, extensive color correction tools, Ultra HD up to 8K, more than 400 video- and audio effects, two interfaces for audio plug-ins (LADSPA, and LV2 such as Calf Studio Gear), multiple denoisers and motion stabilizers, multi-camera editing, proxies, smart folders media filtering, 8, 10 and 12 bit color spaces, advanced trim, live preview of resources, shared tracks, group edits, horizontal and/or vertical timeline split, rendering pre-configuration options, and the ability to save workspace layouts. It supports over 400 video/picture formats for decoding, and over 140 for encoding, including Apple ProRes, AV1, and WEBP. It has a ¨Sketcher" plug-in for free-hand drawing, supports creating HD Blu-ray, and DVDs, and some OpenCV plugins like FindObj. It allows nested clips, and clip sharing between projects ("file-by-reference").

Its hardware support is for jog-wheels ShuttlePRO V.2 and ShuttleXpress from Contour Design, multiple monitors, HiDPI, and hardware-supported decoding/encoding via VAAPI/VDPAU/CUDA.

Like the other Cinelerra variants Cinelerra-GG uses its own GUI. It has eleven GUI themes to cater to user preferences.

The GG variant is under active development, with regular stable releases. It is supplied as a 64 or 32 bit AppImage for Linux. The source code is available as (manual) monthly download or from its git.

Before 2021, it was supplied as a multi user program pre-packaged for eight different Linux distributions (Ubuntu, Debian, Arch, OpenSuse, Slackware, Fedora, Centos, Mint), and FreeBSD. When the applicable repository was added to a distribution's update manager, the monthly updates would appear automatically. In addition, there were single-user builds for the eight Linux distributions plus Gentoo, as tar files. All those builds are available in 64-bit, for Debian 9, Slackware and Ubuntu 14 there are also 32-bit single user builds. As a proof-of-concept, with the 2020-01 release was a Windows version with limited functionality; for details see the manual's chapter 1.

In addition to the GG variant's monthly releases, it is also available in two Linux variants dedicated to multimedia: AVLinux, and Bodhi Linux Media. It is also included in DeLinuxCo, and in lightweight Elive, of which the 32 bit version is usable on older computers.

Cinelerra-GG communicates with it users and developers through three platforms: its forum (user oriented), a bug tracker (feature requests, bugs, roadmap), and a mailing list (developers discussions). Each monthly release has a significant number of changes resulting from discussions and exchanges of information on these platforms.

Cinelerra-GG has an extensive, actively maintained manual in both PDF and HTML form, which is also accessible from within the Cinelerra-GG program. The manual is helpful for both beginners (e.g. Quickstart section) and professionals. There is also a YouTube channel with tutorials.

The differences between the GG and other Cinelerra variants can be found in .

== History of Cinelerra versions ==
Events from the original creator Heroine Virtual have been indicated with Broadcast/Broadcast2000 and HV, those of the "community version" with CV, and those of the GG Infinity variant with GG.

| Variant | Version | Release date | Changes |
|---|---|---|---|
| Broadcast | 1.0 | 1996 | From the "Secrets of Cinelerra" by A. Williams: "It was just a window with a waveform in it, it could cut and paste stereo audio waveforms on a UNIX box, except unlike other audio editors it could handle files up to 2 gigabytes with only 64 megs of RAM." |
| Broadcast | 2.0 | 1997 | From the "Secrets of Cinelerra" by A. Williams: "2.0 still only handled audio. A few effects could be performed as the audio was playing back, in realtime. Unlimited numbers of tracks, fade, pan, EQ." |
| Broadcast 2000 | Beta 1 | 1999-05-10 | From the Heroine Virtual website's Broadcast NEWS section: Sucked. From the "Secrets of Cinelerra" by A. Williams: "This iteration of the Broadcast series could do wonders with audio and offered a pretty good video feature set. It could edit video files up to 64 terabytes." |
| Broadcast 2000 | Beta 2 | 1999-09-09 | From the Heroine Virtual website's Broadcast NEWS section: "Transitions, more plugins, SMP support, non-square pixels, interpolation. Fell in love with the Russian Heroine" |
| Broadcast 2000 | Final | 2000-01-10 | From the Heroine Virtual website's Broadcast NEWS section: "Direct copy playback. Direct copy rendering, MP3 and M2V decoder, rotation, plugin automation, image stabilization, spectrogram, double click selections, frame average, variable, edit handle functions, feet-frame timecode, frame advance, track concatenation, frame rate normalization. Fell out of love with the Russian Heroine." |
| Broadcast 2000 | Bcast2000a | 2000-07-20 | From the Heroine Virtual website's Broadcast NEWS section: "RGB to 601 conversion, convolution, wirl, polarize, shift interlace, YUV adjust plugins. Firewire, LML33, Esound support. 2 gigabyte overflows allowed. Relative paths in HTAL files. Fewer audio crashes than it already had. Fell in and out of love with the Hardware Heroine." |
| Broadcast 2000 | Bcast2000b | 2000-10-11 | From the Heroine Virtual website's Broadcast NEWS section: "The second incremental update. Features Freeverb, Pentium I executable, effect bugfix. Function prototypes migrated to Linux 2.2.17, gcc 2.96, libc2.92. Fell in love with Heroine College." |
| Broadcast 2000 | Bcast2000c | 2001-01-10 | From the Heroine Virtual website's Broadcast NEWS section:. "Supports movies larger than 4 gigabytes. No longer supports 2 gig subdivisions. Improved MPEG editing. Improved DV quality. Function prototypes migrated to Linux 2.4.0." |
| | | 2000-06-15 | Founding of the Cinelerra project. After numerous discussions between Adam Williams and Michael Collins about the direction of Non-Linear Editing on Linux, Williams presented the name and concept of Cinelerra to business partner Michael Collins in Sunnyvale, California. |
| HV | Beta 1 | 2002-06-10 | HV's SourceForge backup files show frequent activity up since 2001-09-09 straight up to release 1.1.0 . |
| HV | Beta 2 | 2002-07-12 | |
| HV | 1.0.0 | 2002-08-12 | Initial release. |
| HV | 110802 | 2002-11-08 | This release still identified itself as version 1.1.0, but had considerable changes compared to the 2002-08-12 release, for instance LADSPA support and titler changes. Because there are 3 separate blocks of comment in the change log since the 2002-08-12 release, this is more like a version 1.1.3 |
| HV | 1.1.5 | 2003-02-11 | From the change log in the source (selection): ¨Adaptive deinterlace, proper 16 bit alpha blending, more ffmpeg/MPEG-4 options¨ |
| CV | 1.1.5 | 2003-04-29 | HV code "forked" into a community CVS version. |
| HV | 1.1.6 | 2003-05-12 | From the change log in the source (selection): "Paste silence and clipboards shifts effect keyframes properly, titler improvements, IEEE1394 improvements, allow add track anywhere in timeline, auto-scroll timeline when dragging cursor." |
| HV | 1.1.7 | 2003-08-11 | From the change log in the source (selection): "Time stretch based on overlapping windows instead of FFT, use ffmpeg decoder for MPEG-4, freeze frame has line doubling option, importing of dvgrab and lavtools AVI files. Adaptations for 64 bit X86 CPU." |
| CV | 1.1.7 | 2003-10-05 | Merge with community CVS version. |
| HV | 1.1.8 | 2003-11-11 | From the change log in the source (selection): "File box sorting, track nudge, more tooltips, patternless Inverse Telecine, oversampling improvements." |
| HV | 1.1.9 | 2004-02-11 | From the Heroine Virtual website's NEWS section: ¨This is a landmark since it's probably the first time more code was submitted from the community than internally.¨ |
| CV | 1.1.9 | 2004-02-17 | Merge with community CVS version. |
| HV | 1.2.0 | 2004-05-11 | From the Heroine Virtual website's NEWS section: "Cinelerra has a massive number of small changes. Quicktime finally decodes Sorenson and compressed headers." |
| HV | 1.2.1 | 2004-08-12 | From the Heroine Virtual website's NEWS section: "Quicktime 2.0.4 updated. Enter the world of floating point imaging in this release. It's not just a more accurate colorspace, it's a totally new way of thinking about color. Finally, Cinelerra is officially more stable in 64 bit mode than 32 bit mode." |
| CV | 1.2.1 | 2004-08-16 | Merged with community CVS version. Special enhancements were added to this version E.g. H264 Kod. Cineon used at NAB under Fedora 1,2 and BSD 5, this could handle 4k film 4096x4096 if graphics card permits. Fast frame rate in excess of 210 frames per second at 720x480 29.97, while bringing in live HD video in the timeline from a video camera. video4linux driver Zoran chip. |
| HV | 1.2.2 | 2005-01-10 | From the change log in the source (selection): "Treshold effect, unsharp mask effect, spherical gradient, motion and rotation tracking, greyscale TIFF loading, quicktime RGBA8888 reading and writing." |
| CV | 1.2.2 | 2005-01-18 | Merged with community CVS version. |
| CV | 2.0 | 2005-09-29 | Merge with community SVN version. |
| HV | 2.0 | 2005-10-04 | From the Heroine Virtual website's NEWS section: "H.264 encoding and MPEG-4 audio encoding. Import MPEG video directly.¨ |
| HV | 2.1 | 2006-07-02 | From the change log in the source (selection): "Multiple audio processing improvements, compositor improvements, limited DVD subtitle support, OpenGL support for compositing and many effects, motion tracking improvements." |
| CV | 2.1 | 2006-09-07 | Merge with community SVN version. (The first use of git and a multi-person merge) |
| HV | 4.0 | 2008-08-11 | Since all versions 2.0 onward 10bit (useful for prof. Cinepaint) and 16bit RGB(A),YUV(A) have been removed and replaced with RGB YUV Float instead. |
| HV | 4.1 | 2009-09-25 | From the Heroine Virtual website's NEWS section: "Main feature is nested sequences. The Viewer window does not display video clips, Bug fixed in next version at the expense of another feature removed." |
| HV | 4.2 | 2010-10-17 | From the Heroine Virtual website's NEWS section: "Mainly a bugfix & personal need release. `Edit->Align edits` feature, which aligns all the audio edits with the video. Keyframe spanning feature, where highlighting a region with keyframe generation on causes effect tweeks to span all the keyframes. All assets are now opened in subprocesses so they don't bring down the entire program when they crash. Cannot drag and drop edit clips anymore, feature removed here and future versions." |
| CV | 2.1.5 | 2010-11-21 | From the Cinelerra-CV website's NEWS section: ¨CinelerraCV 2.1.5 is out, with SOWT audio support, other improvements and bug fixes. For more details see the release announcement." |
| HV | 4.3 | 2011-08-06 | From the Heroine Virtual website's NEWS section: "Text to movie". Allows one to turn a script into an instant movie with live updating and seeking. |
| CV | 2.2 | 2011-11-13 | From the Cinelerra-CV website's NEWS section: "It includes Hermann Vosseler's Bezier Patch (Bézier automation for Cinelerra-CV fades, camera and projector), improved default settings, extended audio range, support for multiline label and clips comments, autodetection of OpenGL in configure, detection of v4l2.¨ |
| HV | 4.4 | 2012-09-07 | From the Heroine Virtual website's NEWS section: ¨Faster startup and responsiveness, audio oscilloscope, new bright theme, and also 3 way colour correction." |
| HV | 4.5 | 2013-10-25 | From the Heroine Virtual website's NEWS section: "Speed curves mainly for video & in degraded quality for audio. Some control over whether automation follows edits. Ability to transfer keyframes between audio and video tracks. Motion temporaries are stored in /tmp/m and /tmp/r files. Time Avg clears the accumulator on keyframes." |
| HV | 4.6 | 2014-09-10 | From the Heroine Virtual website's NEWS section: "Split pane editing. OpenGL supported on Intel HD. Titler improvements. Bugfixes.¨ |
| org | 5.0 | 2015-07-04 | Cinelerra.org releases a studio centric version of Cinelerra titled 5.0. Cinelerra is now fully integrated with FFMPEG and supports numerous 4K and 2K uncompressed cinema standards from such camera manufacturers as AJA, Blackmagic Design, and Red. |
| CV | 2.3 | 2015-08-13 | From the Cinelerra-CV website's NEWS section: "Full UTF-8 support; Complete new overlay engine and resampler; New graphics: About panel, some icons; New plugins: GreyCStoration, C41, Bluebanana, color3way, findobject, lens; Some translations have been updated (German, Italian, French, Norwegian, Portuguese); Lots of small bugfixes; Changes in build system" |
| HV | 4.6.1 | 2015-11-09 | From the Heroine Virtual website's NEWS section: ¨Updated the x264 compressor library. Improved the mp3 decoding. Video scaling is now either nearest neighbor or bicubic, but never linear. Proxy editing got a start before discovering modern PCs can easily decode 4k." |
| 5.1 (GG) | 5.1 | 2016-03-31 | The first of monthly releases of a branch separate from the HV, CV and .org versions, first under the name Cinelerra 5.1, but from September 2018 as Cinelerra-GG Infinity. |
| HV | 6.0 | 2016-11-17 | From the Heroine Virtual website's NEWS section: "Updated the h264 decoding. There are no longer picons in the asset window. Motion tracking got major optimizations. Resampling effects got new interfaces. Titler can load subtitle files.¨ |
| HV | 7.0 | 2017-10-13 | From the Heroine Virtual website's NEWS section: "Optimized playback of large format video. H.265 decoding. Optimized screen capturing. Spherical camera blending. Eyedropper can show the maximum value. Interpolating CR2 images always white balances." |
| GG | 2018-09 | 2018-09-30 | First of monthly releases of the Cinelerra-GG Infinity version, this is a rolling release. See the release notes which cover monthly releases since mid-2016, initially not under the GG name but as version 5.1 . |
| HV | 7.1 | 2019-01-23 | From the Heroine Virtual website's NEWS section: ¨Exporting of H.265 video in Quicktime. Seeking for MKV/WEBM files. More bugs fixed.¨ |
| GG | 2019-01 | 2019-01-31 | The 5th monthly release of Cinelerra-GG Infinity adds support for jog-wheels ShuttlePRO V.2 and ShuttleXpress from Contour Design. |
| GG | 2019-04 | 2019-04-30 | The 8th monthly release of Cinelerra-GG Infinity allows GPU-accelerated decoding for some video formats. |
| GG | 2019-05 | 2019-05-31 | The 9th monthly release of Cinelerra-GG Infinity adds GPU-accelerated encoding for some video formats. |
| GG | 2019-07 | 2019-07-31 | The 11th monthly release of Cinelerra-GG Infinity has significant improvements in masking. |
| HV | 7.2 | 2019-10-11 | From the Heroine Virtual website's NEWS section: " A long awaited audio upgrade. New flanger, chorus, tremolo, & multiband compressor. Reverb got a full band pass filter. Compressor got VU meters & grid snapping. Pulseaudio support. Sample accurate keyframes for audio plugins. Better synchronization between the audio plugins & the playhead. Right click on an edit to get an info box. The ever present bug fixes." |
| GG | 2019-10 | 2019-10-31 | The 14th monthly release of Cinelerra-GG Infinity adds scaling for HiDPI monitors, and speeds up AV1 decoding. |
| GG | 2020-01 | 2020-01-31 | The 17th monthly release of Cinelerra-GG Infinity adds OpenSuse Tumbleweed as supported platform, and Gentoo as single user platform. In addition, a limited Windows version is available. |
| GG | 2020-07 | 2020-07-31 | The 23rd monthly release of Cinelerra-GG Infinity adds aligning video using timecodes, two more subtitle formats, and auto-rotate for videos with rotation metadata set. |
| GG | 2021-02 | 2021-02-28 | The 27th release of Cinelerra-GG Infinity. The release format is changed from distro-specific packaging to AppImage. Other changes: autosave backups optional feature is now a Settings in Preferences under Appearance; additional FFmpeg video/audio render formats available such as dnxhr variants; aspect ratio and interlace improvements; batch Render menu now has a hidden feature to prevent mistakes which can be turned on/off; Openjpeg upgraded from 2.3.1 to 2.4.0. |
| HV | 7.3 | 2021-03-04 | From the Heroine Virtual website's NEWS section: "Bug fixes for running on a 4K monitor. Support for odd frame sizes in OpenGL. CR3 file format. Automatic histogram value." |
| GG | 2021-05 | 2021-05-31 | The 29th release of Cinelerra-GG Infinity. It adds context-sensitive help via alt-h. |
| GG | 2021-07 | 2021-07-31 | The 31st release of Cinelerra-GG Infinity. Updates to x264, x265 and AV1 codecs, H.265 10 and 12 bit support updated and combined with 8 bit, improvements in EDL export, PAL/NTSC color space split. |
| GG | 2021-08 | 2021-08-31 | The 32nd release of Cinelerra-GG Infinity. The built-in ffmpeg upgraded to version 4.4, over 20 new audio/video effects, configurable fast/slow speeds. |
| HV | 7.4 | 2021-10-21 | From the Heroine Virtual website's NEWS section: "Load a nested EDL without pasting it. Swap an asset for a nested EDL. Change the frame rate of a nested EDL. Transparency checkerboard. Change parameters of a single edit with text entry. Checks for recursive nested EDLs. Memory management bugfixes" |
| GG | 2021-10 | 2021-10-31 | The 34th release of Cinelerra-GG Infinity. Additional render formats (Cineform, DPX, MXF), Hungarian as GUI language added, fix for title fade, fix slow startup due to unneeded discovery of plugins. |
| GG | 2022-03 | 2022-03-31 | The 39th release of Cinelerra-GG Infinity. A pre-built version for FreeBSD 12.3 and FreeBSD 13 is available in the test section. For aarch64 an AppImage can be built. Multiple libraries updates, faster AV1 support, build scripts improvements, dvd render improvement. |
| GG | 2022-05 | 2022-05-31 | The 41st release of Cinelerra-GG Infinity. Built-in OpenJPEG upgraded from 2.4.0 to 2.5.0. LV2 audio plugin improvements. Fixes for Blu-ray, non-linux platforms, Timecode (Ctrl-!), and memory/resource leaks. Various build improvements, vaapi render formats QT and MKV added. |
| GG | 2022-08 | 2022-08-31 | The 44th release of Cinelerra-GG Infinity. Built-in FFMPEG libraries upgraded from 4.4 to 5.1 . 11 new video plugins, 10 new audio plugins, and multiple render formats added. |
| HV | 8 | 2022-10-23 | From the Heroine Virtual website's NEWS section: "GPU accelerated rendering. Faster GPU accelerated playback. Write output to command line ffmpeg." |
| HV | 9 | 2024-05-17 | From the Heroine Virtual website's NEWS section: "Previews for transitions & file dialogs. Color curves, revised chromakey HSV, lookahead stabilizer, improved title alignments, more keyframe features, swap channels on different tracks. Fewer bugs. More documentation." |
| HV | 10.1 | 2026-03-21 | |
| GG | 2026-05 | 2026-05-01 | NEWS |
| GG | 2026-10 | 2026-10-31 | Big ffmpeg update, plus many others, see NEWS |
Legend: Latest version

== See also ==
- List of video editing software
- Comparison of video editing software
