= Nero Multimedia Suite =

Computer software

Nero Platinum Suite
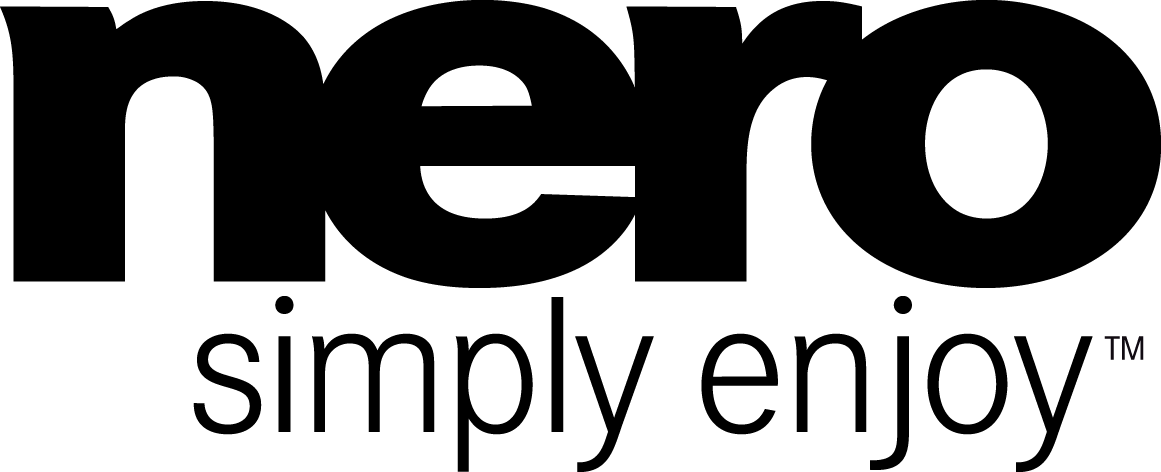

- Nero 10 running under Windows 7
- Developer: Nero AG
- Release: 1997; 29 years ago
- Stable release: 2027 / 2026; 0 years ago
- Operating system: Windows 7 and later
- Platform: IA-32
- Available in: English, Chinese (Simplified), Chinese (Traditional), Czech, Danish, Dutch, Finnish, French, German, Greek, Hungarian, Italian, Japanese, Korean, Norwegian, Polish, Portuguese (Brazil), Portuguese (Portugal), Russian, Spanish, Swedish, Thai and Turkish
- Type: Software suite
- License: Trialware
- Website: www.nero.com

Nero Platinum Suite (formerly known as Nero Multimedia Suite) is a software suite for Microsoft Windows that is developed and marketed by Nero AG. Version 2026 is the latest version of the suite released in 2025.

== Version differences ==
Since its Version 10, Nero provides two variants of the suite – the Classic and the Platinum. The Platinum version includes the following additional functions:

- Music recorder - to record MP3s from worldwide radios stations (since Nero 2016)
- Video editing in Ultra-HD (since version 2014) and in HEVC (Since Nero 2017 but only available in Nero Video and not available in Nero Recode)
- Additional video, transition and picture-in-picture effects
- SecurDisc 4.0 Technology with 256 bit-encryption (since Nero 2017)
- Additional film templates and disc menu templates
- Blu-ray disc ripping and conversion
- Blu-ray playback (not possible with Nero 2016, only with previous versions)

== Included products ==
The following applications are included in Nero 2016:

=== Disc authoring and copying ===
- Nero Burning ROM: an optical disc authoring program for CDs, DVDs, and Blu-rays by Nero AG and one of its first products. The product is also available separately. It includes several functions for audio format conversion, the creation of audio CDs, etc.. As of version 2015, Nero AirBurn App and Nero Burning ROM enable users to burn media via their mobile devices.
- Nero Express: a simplified version of Nero Burning ROM targeted at novices. The Nero AirBurn app does not work with Nero Express.

=== Video editing and creating of video discs ===
- Nero Video: is a software tool for creating and editing videos. It combines editing tools (including the addition of effects, music and themes) and video export as well as DVD and Blu-ray authoring. The product provides simple editing functions for novices (in Express mode) as well as advanced video editing (Advanced mode). It is available separately as a download.

=== Data conversion ===
- Nero Recode: converts video and audio files as well as non-copyright-protected video DVDs and Blu-Rays into multiple video formats.
- Nero Disc to Device is an easy-to-use application for converting video discs and audio CDs for playback on mobile devices or in the cloud.
- Nero MediaHome enables users to manage and play their images, videos and music files. Alongside ripping and the creation of playlists and slideshows, MediaHome includes features that let users sort their media, including tagging, face recognition system in photos, geo location support and manual geotagging for photos and videos. Streaming to TVs and home media players is also included. Starting with Version 2015, users can stream media directly to their mobile devices (iOS, Android, Amazon) with the Nero MediaHome Receiver App. Nero MediaHome is also available with limited functionality as a free download from nero.com.
- Nero Media Browser: simple tools for retrieving media content. It makes the Nero MediaHome media library also available to non-Nero programs using simple drag and drop.
- Nero Blu-ray Player (not in Nero 2016 Platinum, only in the previous Platinum version.): media player for Blu-ray discs

=== Data rescue ===
- Nero RescueAgent: helps users to recover files from damaged or partially unreadable media (discs, hard disks, USB thumb drives and flash drives) and to restore files that were accidentally deleted.
- Nero BackItUp: a system backup utility. It was integral part of Nero 6, 7, 8, 10 and 11 suites. With the introduction of Nero 9 Nero BackItUp 4 became a standalone backup product, while its successor, Nero BackItUp 5, was the main application of Nero BackItUp & Burn Later, the product was re-integrated into Nero Multimedia Suite 10 and is now included in Nero 11. The product can also be purchased separately.

=== Free Tools ===
The following components were part of the suite until Version 11. They are now available for download separately and are free of charge.

- Nero CoverDesigner: enables users to design and print disc covers and labels
- Nero BurnRights: enables administrators to provide other users with access to drives
- Nero DiscSpeed: a disc speed measurement and performance diagnostics tool, including benchmarking and surface error scanning.
- Nero WaveEditor: an audio editing tool capable of recording, editing, filtering, and exporting music files.
- Nero SoundTrax: a tool for recording, mixing and digitizing music tracks.
- Nero InCD Reader 5: this tools enables users to read CDs created with InCD
- Nero SecurDisc Viewer: this tool enables users to read discs created with SecurDisc.
- Nero InfoTool: Detailed system information browser
- Nero AI tools: including Nero AI Image Upscaler, Nero AI Photo Colorize, Nero AI Photo restoration, Nero AI Face Animation, Nero AI Avatar Generator and Nero AI Image Compressor.
