= Show business (disambiguation) =

Show business, or Showbiz, is a vernacular term for the business of entertainment.

Show Business may also refer to:

== Film and television ==
- Show Business (1938 film), a 1938 Australian film musical
- Show Business (1944 film), a musical
- ShowBusiness: The Road to Broadway, a 2005 American documentary
- Louie Spence's Showbusiness, docusoap and follow up to Pineapple Dance Studios

== Other ==
- Show Business (novel), a 1992 postmodern satirical novel by Shashi Tharoor
- Show Business (magazine), a performing arts magazine since 1941
- Show Business (album), a 1995 album by the glam metal band KIX
- Showbusiness!, a 1994 live album by Chumbawamba
- "Show Business", a song by AC/DC from the 1975 album High Voltage

== See also ==
- Showbiz (disambiguation)
- "There's No Business Like Show Business", an Irving Berlin song for the 1946 musical Annie Get Your Gun
