= NewBlue =

Multimedia Software Company based in San Diego, California

NewBlue, Inc.
- Type: Privately held
- Industry: Software
- Founded: 2006; 20 years ago
- Headquarters: San Diego, California, U.S.
- Products: Graphics software for post and live productions

NewBlue was founded in 2006 in San Diego, California developing software for the post production video industry.

The company began by developing video effects, transitions, and titling software for consumer and professional video editing software host applications. The company has licensed its software ("plugins") for use in Avid Media Composer, Grass Valley EDIUS, Sony VEGAS, MAGIX Movie Edit Pro, Corel VideoStudio, Pinnacle Studio, CyberLink PowerDirector and Wondershare Filmora.

At the urging of a leading manufacturer of live video production switchers, NewBlue entered the live production side of the video industry in 2016. Titler Live was launched that year and is used by a variety of broadcast, education, sports, house of worship, corporate and government customers. NewBlue’s live video production technology has also been licensed by Telestream, PrestoSports, and Broadcast Pix.

NewBlue has a broad portfolio of more than ten patented technologies in cloud video production, data-driven graphics, live and post graphics, real-time graphics rendering, and live-to-post video production. Patent information can be viewed the US Patent Trademark Office.

In July 2021, NewBlue used the Blackmagic Design SDK to combine the ATEM with the NewBlue graphics software. The combination provides on-air graphics and live switching.

== Products ==
- Titler Live. graphics software for live video productions.
- Fusion 2. A short-depth 1U rackmount chassis running Titler Live Broadcast.
- VividCast. All-in-one live video streaming software
- TotalFX. titling, tools and effects plugins for video editing.
- Titler Pro. Titling software for video editors.
