= Pitivi =

Open-source video editing software for Linux

- The Pitivi logo is a clapperboard

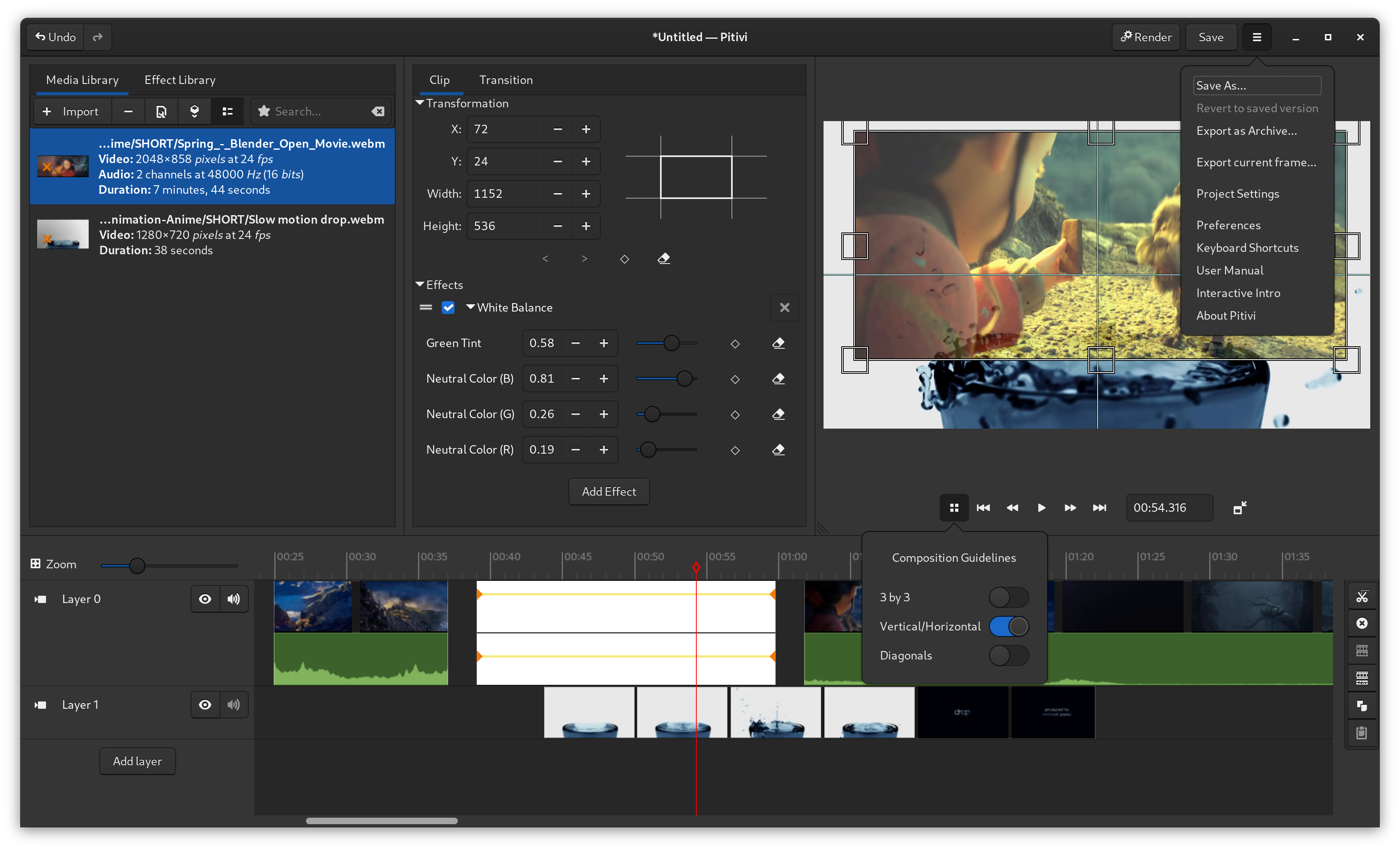
- Pitivi (version 2021.01)
- Original author: Edward Hervey
- Developers: The Pitivi development team and the GNOME project
- Release: 1 May 2004; 22 years ago
- Stable release: 2023.03.0 / 26 March 2023; 3 years ago
- Written in: Python (initially in C) with GTK
- Operating system: Unix-like
- Platform: GStreamer
- Type: Non-linear editing system
- License: LGPL-2.1-or-later
- Website: pitivi.org
- Repository: gitlab.gnome.org/GNOME/pitivi

Pitivi (originally spelled PiTiVi) is a free and open-source non-linear video editor for Linux, developed by various contributors from free software community and the GNOME project, with support also available from Collabora. Pitivi is designed to be the default video editing software for the GNOME desktop environment. It is licensed under the terms of the GNU Lesser General Public License.

== History ==
Edward Hervey started working on PiTiVi in December 2003 as an end-of-studies project at the EPITECH engineering school in Paris. Initially written in C, the PiTiVi codebase was first checked into version control in May 2004 and was rewritten in Python a year later.

After his graduation, Hervey was hired by Fluendo to work on GStreamer for the following two years, after which Hervey co-founded Collabora's Multimedia division in order to improve Pitivi, GStreamer and the GNonLin plugins from 2008 to 2010.

In the past there have been several video editors available for Linux, but, they were considered difficult to use. Ubuntu Community Manager Jono Bacon stated "Back in 2006, the video editing situation was looking far more exciting. Michael Dominik was working on the hugely exciting Diva project and Edward Hervey was working on PiTiVi. Both combined exciting technologies, being built on the formidable foundations of GTK, GNOME, GStreamer, and Cairo. Diva was developed using Mono, and PiTiVi using Python. With the video buzz in the air, Michael and Edward both demoed their projects at the Villanova GUADEC to rapturous applause".

Bacon also noted that Pitivi has taken a long time to mature: "For Edward to have created the first incarnation of PiTiVi he needed to ensure that GStreamer and GNonLin were mature and stable enough to use for his application".

=== Inclusion in the default set of Ubuntu applications ===
In April 2010, with the launch of Ubuntu 10.04 Lucid Lynx, PiTiVi version 0.13.4 became the first default movie editor offered as part of the Ubuntu ISO CD.

In May 2011, it was announced that Pitivi would be no longer part of the Ubuntu ISO, starting with Ubuntu 11.10 Oneiric Ocelot's release in October 2011. The reasons given for removing it included "poor user reception, lack of fit with the default user-case for Ubuntu, lack of polish and the application's lack of development maturity". PiTiVi will not be replaced on the ISO with another video editor and will remain available to users for installation from the Ubuntu repositories.

In response to this, Jeff Fortin, one of the project developers raised concerns regarding the reasons given for removing Pitivi from the set of default applications and voiced disappointment in Canonical/Ubuntu not supporting the application as they would have been expected to.

=== Rework ===
Edward Hervey announced the availability of GStreamer Editing Services (GES) at the end of 2009. Further confirmations of intentions to migrate Pitivi to GES came at the Meego conference in 2011 but it was not until the 0.15 release in September 2011 that Thibault Saunier officially announced that the next Pitivi release would be based upon GES.

The first version using GES was 0.91 "Charming Defects", released in October 2013. Due to the new engine, a lot of old code could be removed and the Pitivi codebase underwent massive reorganization, cleanup and refactoring. Multiple architectural changes occurred during the time between the 0.15 and the 0.91 release, including three intertwined technological migrations:

- Porting the user interface to GTK 3
- Porting from static Python bindings PyGTK to PyGObject, which uses GObject Introspection
- Porting from GStreamer 0.10 to GStreamer 1.0

During the final stages of these changes leading to the 0.91 release, the timeline was also ported from the Canvas (scene graph) "GooCanvas" to Clutter.

=== Re-branding as Pitivi ===
With the release of 0.91, PiTiVi was renamed Pitivi, without the "T" and "V" capitalized.

=== Fundraising ===
In February 2014 the project announced that it was seeking €100,000 for further development. The money was to be allocated, as follows: Phase 1 - €35,000 to improve stability for a version 1.0 release. Phase 2 - Improving features, €1,925 for adding a magnetic time-line, €4,400 for interfaces for multi-camera editing, €4,766 for porting to Mac OS X. The fundraising was conducted through the GNOME Foundation. The fundraiser did not meet its targeted amount, reaching slightly above €23,000 as of 2015, allowing for partially funded development.

== Features ==
Pitivi inherits its capabilities for importing and exporting (rendering) media from the GStreamer framework, or plugins for the GStreamer framework. Pitivi supports simple media editing capabilities such as trimming, snapping, splitting and cutting of clips. Audio mixing is supported by curves, visualised as line segments drawn over an audio waveform. Pitivi has the ability to step through a piece of media using scrubbers or keyboard shortcuts. Audio and video clips can be linked together, and treated as a single clip. Initial support for video mixing (compositing and transitions) has been added in late 2009 but is still under heavy work. A more exhaustive list of features can be found on the Pitivi website.

Jean-François Fortin Tam gave a talk at Libre Graphics Meeting 2009, discussing how usability became a major focus for the Pitivi project, and how design considerations impacted PiTiVi's user-interface, with examples such as the use of subtle gradients in timeline objects, drag and drop importing and direct manipulation, native theme integration, and reducing complexity by carefully evaluating the need (or lack thereof) to impose preference choices onto users. Another talk, focused on the economics of open source video editors, was given by Jean-François at Libre Graphics Meeting 2011.

The Pitivi project also has a user manual that covers the usage of the application. Pitivi has been translated and localized for several languages by the GNOME i18n teams.

Through GStreamer, Pitivi is the first open source video editor to support the Material Exchange Format (MXF).

As part of a Google Summer of Code project to "Permit Pitivi users to add effects to the videos they are editing", Thibault Saunier implemented video effects in the development version of Pitivi. This work was initially anticipated to be included starting with PiTiVi 0.13.5, but was announced as being deferred to the 0.13.6 release. These features were finally released as version 0.14.0-2 on 1 June 2011. Aside from improved and expanded effects this version included a new welcome screen, a redesigned project settings dialog box and a simplified rendering dialog. In reviewing this version for OMG! Ubuntu! writer Joey Sneddon said of the new rendering that it "totally wipes the floor with its competition: it is so incredibly simple to use".

== Sponsorship ==
Throughout the years, development has been funded through the Google Summer of Code program, donations and paid developer time.

At the end of 2008, Collabora Multimedia decided to fund the development of Pitivi throughout 2009 by assigning Edward Hervey, Brandon Lewis and Alessandro Decina to improve Pitivi and GNonlin. After this two-year effort, as Collabora's direct involvement gradually came to an end, a new team of contributors from the community took over the maintainership of the project, including former GSoC student Thibault Saunier.

In 2014, a public fundraiser was run through the GNOME Foundation to allow two maintainers, Mathieu Duponchelle and Thibault Saunier, to work for a year on bringing Pitivi to "1.0 quality".

== Reception ==
In an interview with gnomedesktop.org in 2009 Edward Hervey discussed the state of Pitivi and Linux Video editing; at one stage Hervey noted that "there's a total lack of cohesion between all the various multimedia applications/libraries/device-support on Linux which is IMHO the reason why we're not yet the reference platform for multimedia creation". This point of view is further expanded in another article that showed that Hervey believed that "if the Linux desktop was going to have a nice and easy to use video editor any time soon, we needed to do something to increase the pace of development significantly".

In a review of Pitivi 0.94 in January 2015 Red Hat Senior Systems Engineer Chris Long said: "It looked great and professional-esque, almost Avid/premiere like. So, I brought in a video clip... and CRASH! I opened it again, brought in a clip, no crash, so that's great. I added another video track... and CRASH! I tried at least 15 more times before giving up on it. And it's a shame, because it looks like it has potential to be simple to use and not overly garish". The release of the next version, 0.95 improved stability.

== See also ==
- Comparison of video editing software
- List of video editing software
