= Showbiz (game) =

Board game

Showbiz is a board game published by Prestige Games in 1984.

== Gameplay ==
Showbiz is a strategy game.

== Reviews ==
- Strategy Plus #2
- Games #50
