= Corel VideoStudio =

Video editing software package

- The main interface of Corel VideoStudio X6 (2013)
- Developer: Ulead Systems (Alludo)
- Stable release: VideoStudio 2023
- Operating system: Microsoft Windows
- Type: Video editing software
- License: Proprietary
- Website: Corel VideoStudio Homepage

Corel VideoStudio (formerly Ulead VideoStudio) is a video editing software package for Microsoft Windows.

== Features ==
=== Basic editing ===
The software allows storyboard and timeline-oriented editing. Various formats are supported for source clips, and the resulting video can be exported to a video file. DVD and AVCHD DVD authoring capabilities are included, and Blu-ray authoring is available via a plug-in. VideoStudio supports direct DV and HDV capture and burning.

=== Overlay ===
Users can overlay videos, images, and text. Using the overlay track, up to 50 clips can be displayed simultaneously. It can handle videos in MOV and AVI formats, including alpha channel, and images in PSP, PSD, PNG, and GIF formats. Clips that do not contain an alpha channel can have specific colours removed from the overlay video so that the required background or image is displayed in the foreground.

=== Proxy video files ===
VideoStudio supports high-definition video. Proxy files are smaller versions of the video source that stand in for the full-resolution source during editing to improve performance.

=== Plug-ins/bundles ===
VideoStudio supports VFX-type plug-ins from providers, including NewBlue and proDAD. proDAD plug-ins Roto-Pen, Script, Vitascene, and Mercalli-Stabilizer are bundled with X4 and later Ultimate Editions.

== Version history ==
- Ulead VideoStudio 4 (1999)
- Ulead VideoStudio 5 (2001)
- Ulead VideoStudio 6 (2002)
- Ulead VideoStudio 7 (2003)
- Ulead VideoStudio 8 (2004)
- Ulead VideoStudio 9 (2005)
- Ulead VideoStudio 10 plus. (2006)
- Corel Ulead VideoStudio 11 plus. (2007)
- Corel VideoStudio Pro X2 (v12, 2008)
- Corel VideoStudio Pro X3 (v13, 2010)
- 2011: Corel VideoStudio Pro X4 (v14, 2011) Adds support for stop motion animation, time-lapse mode photography, 3D movies, and 2nd generation Intel Core.
- Corel VideoStudio Pro X5 (v15, March 9, 2012): Adds HTML5 export (Comparison of HTML5 and Flash).
- Corel VideoStudio Pro X6 (v16, April 25, 2013): Windows 8 compatible. Adds UHD 4K support.
- Corel VideoStudio Pro X7 (v17, March 5, 2014): Software becomes 64-bit.
- Corel VideoStudio Pro X8 (v18, May 8, 2015): Several improvements.
- Corel VideoStudio Pro X9 (v19, February 16, 2016): Windows 10 compatible. Adds H.265 support, Multi-Camera Editor, and Match moving.
- Corel VideoStudio Pro X10 (v20, February 15, 2017): Adds Mask Creator, Track Transparency, and 360-degree video support.
- Corel VideoStudio Pro 2018 (v21, February 13, 2018): Adds split screen Video, Lens Correction, and 3D Title Editor.
- Corel VideoStudio Pro 2019 (v22, February 12, 2019): Adds Color Grading, Morph Transitions, and MultiCam Capture Lite.
- Corel VideoStudio Pro 2020 (v23, February 25, 2020).
- Corel VideoStudio Pro 2021 (v24, March 26, 2021): Adds Instant Project Templates, AR Stickers, and performance improvements (particularly regarding hardware acceleration).
- Corel VideoStudio Pro 2022 (v25, March 6, 2022): Adds face effects, GIF Creator, transitions for Camera Movements, a speech to text converter, and ProRes Smart Proxy.

== See also ==
- Comparison of video editing software
