= VSDC Free Video Editor =

Non-linear editing application

- Developer: Flash-Integro LLC
- Release: 2011; 15 years ago
- Stable release: 10.1 / June 10, 2025; 14 months ago
- Operating system: Windows
- Size: 116 MB
- Available in: 13 languages
- List of languages English, German, French, Italian, Russian, Japanese, Spanish, Portuguese, Simplified Chinese, Urdu, Farsi, Turkish, Hindi
- License: Freeware
- Website: www.videosoftdev.com

VSDC Free Video Editor is a non-linear editing (NLE) application developed by Flash-Integro LLC. It supports high-resolution footage, including 3D and VR 360-degree videos. The software allows for post-production effects, live color correction, and motion tracking. It supports VirtualDub plug-ins and can capture video from screen, record voice, and save multimedia files to various formats, including those configured for social media platforms.

== Overview ==
VSDC runs on Windows 2000 and later. The program allows users to create videos, edit existing files, mix video and audio, add filters, and convert between formats. Users can also capture video from a webcam or screen.

According to the developer, VSDC stands for Video Software Development Company.

== Video processing ==
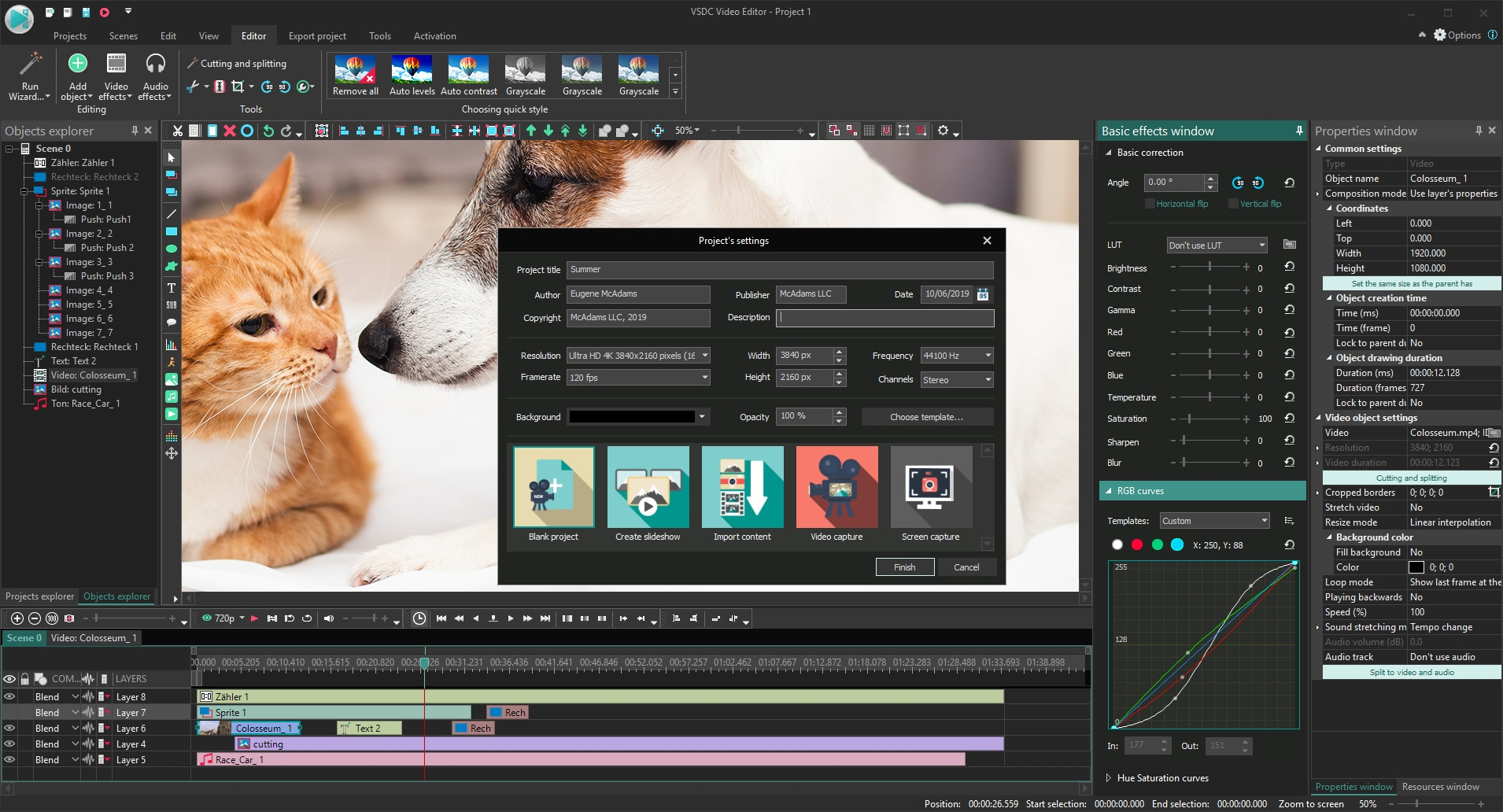
VSDC project's setting interface: fields for basic information about the video project

VSDC provides tools for video editing and post-production, including video creation, slideshows, screen capture, and video conversion. Technical features include motion tracking, color correction (using tools such as a LUT Editor and RGB Curves), and a mask tool for selective filter application. Additional capabilities include multicam editing, chroma keying for green screens, and effects such as filters, transformations, OpenGL effects, and transitions. Projects can be burned to discs or uploaded to social media platforms.

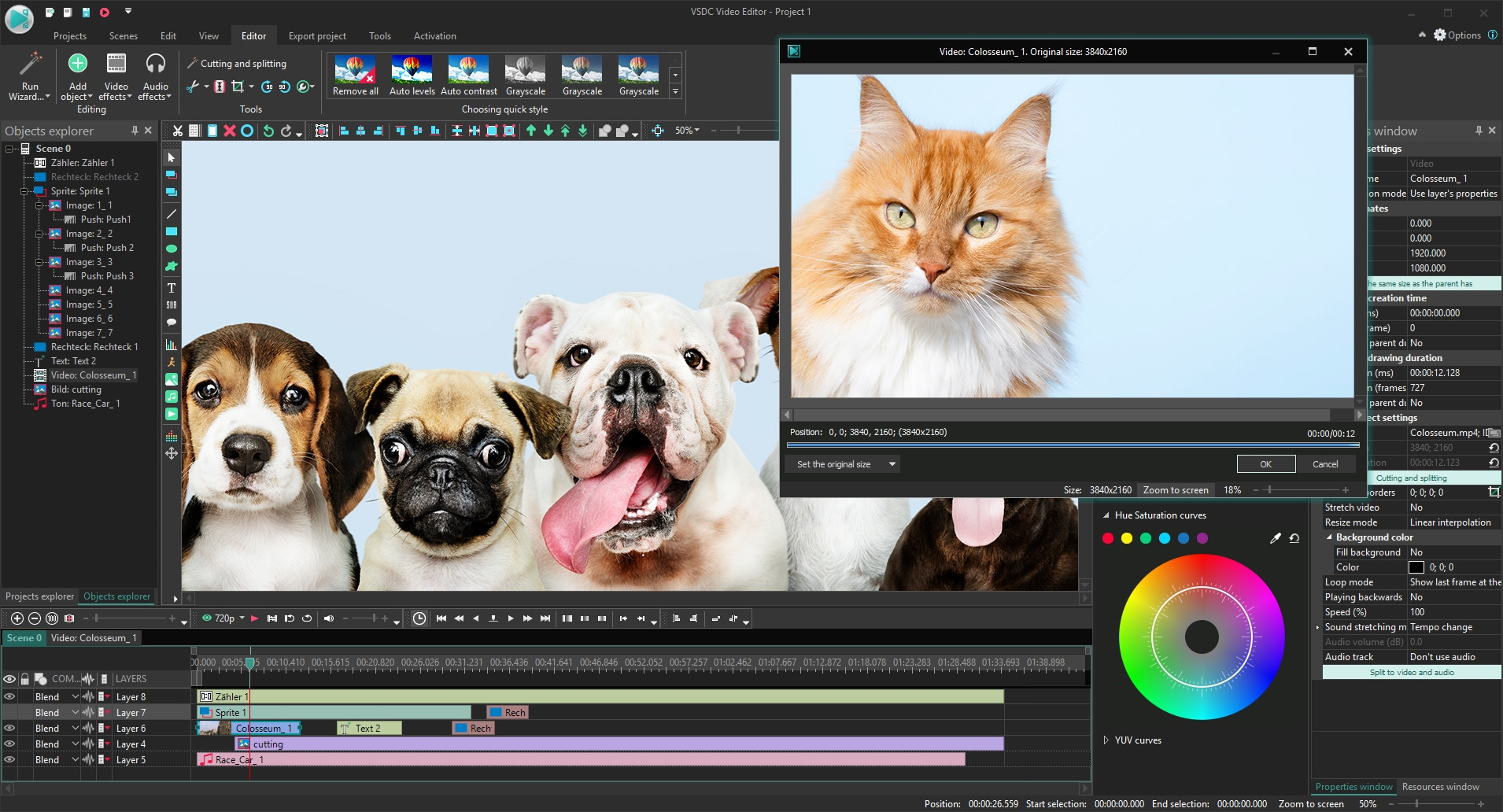
Cropping

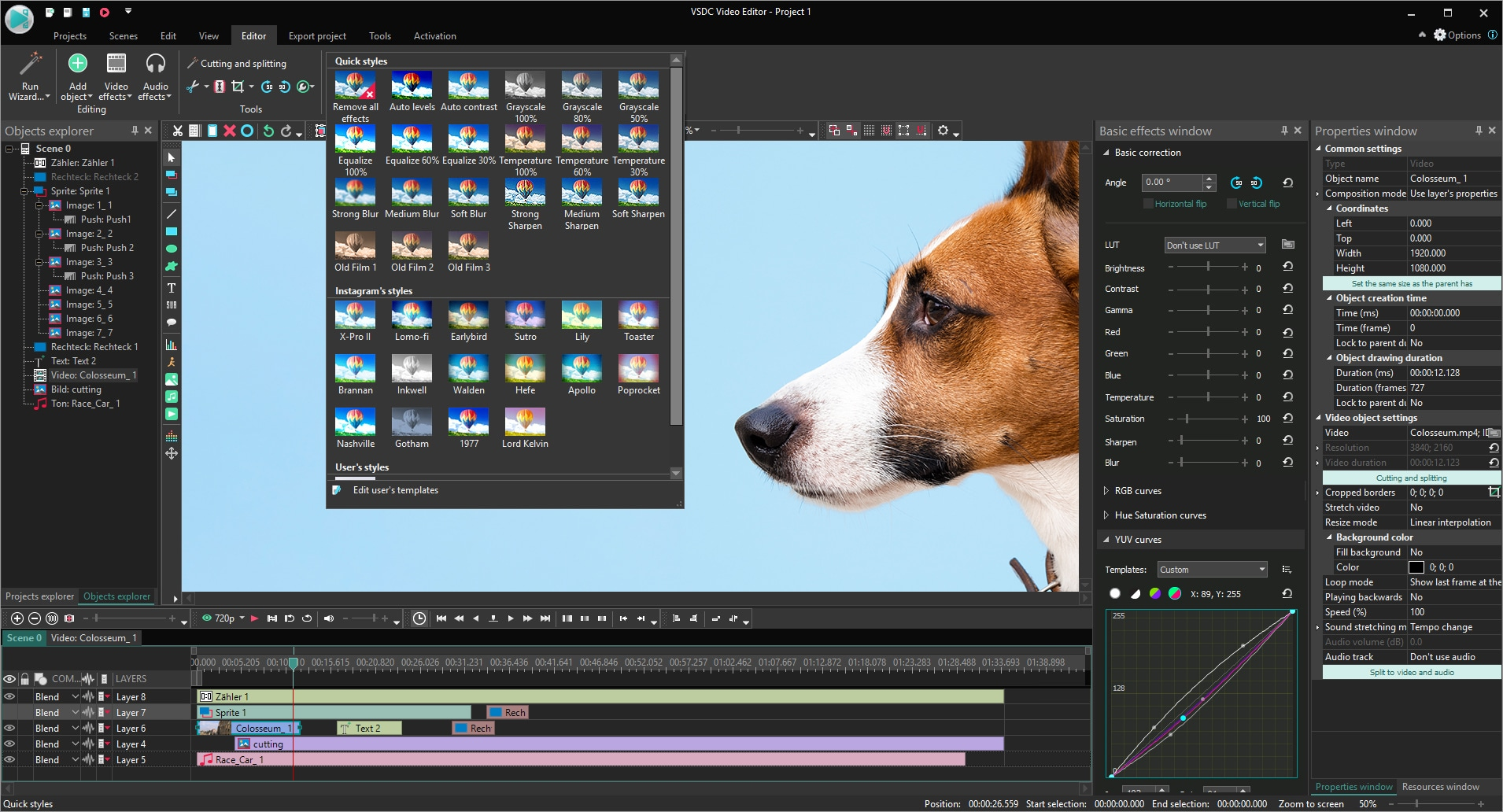
Quick styles

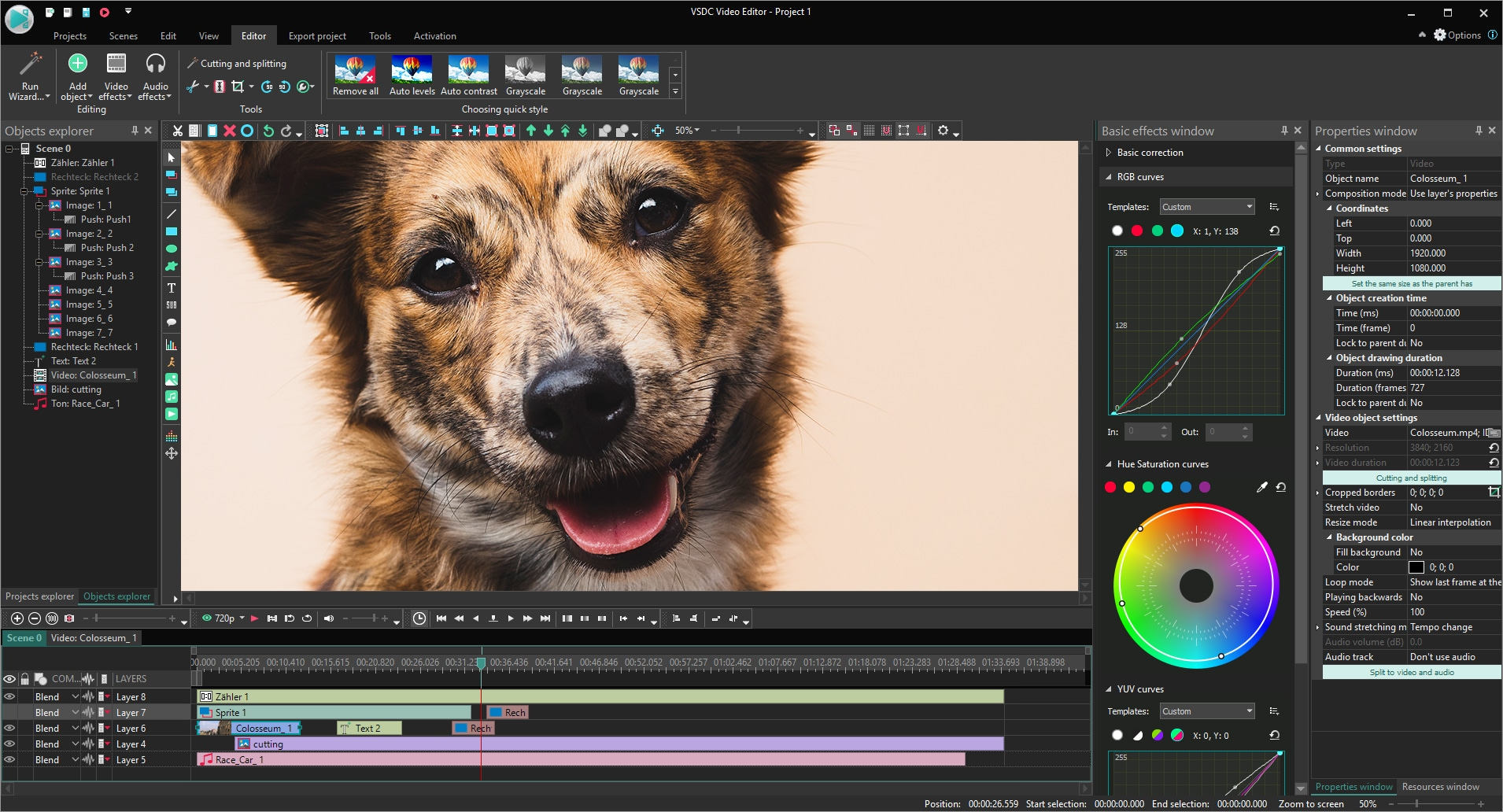
Color correction

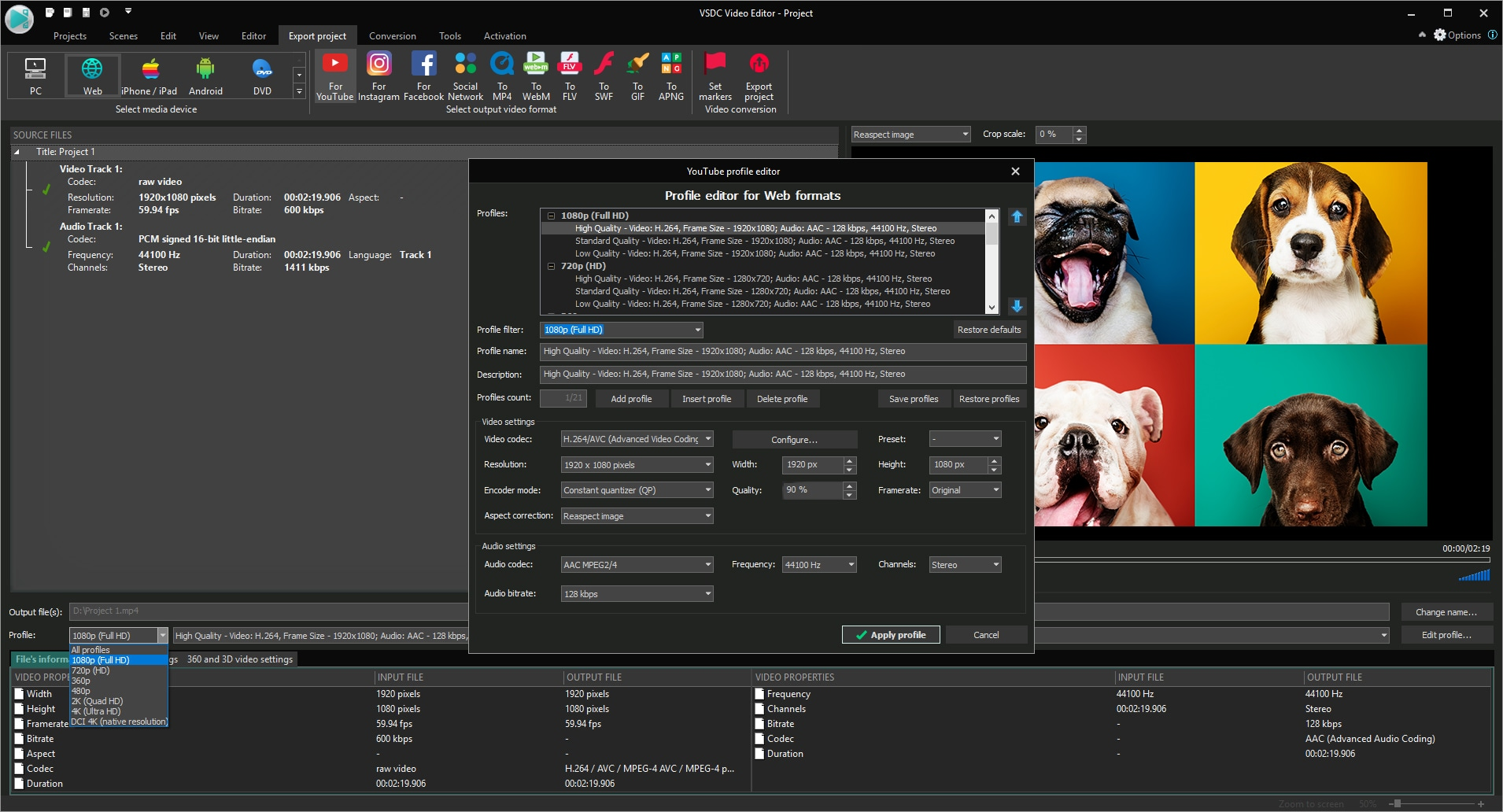
Export profiles

== Audio processing ==
The software includes audio processing features that allow users to split video into separate audio and video layers, edit audio as waveforms, apply effects like normalization and noise reduction, record voiceovers, and synchronize video effects with audio.

== Formats and codecs ==
Import formats
Video	Audio	Image
MXF, WebM, AVI, QuickTime (MP4/M4V, 3GP/2G2, QuickTime File Format), HDVideo/AVCHD (MTS, M2TS, TS, MOD, TOD), Windows Media (WMV, ASF, DVR-MS), DVD/VOB, VCD/SVCD, MPEG/MPEG-1/DAT, Matroska (.mkv), RealMedia (RM, RMVB), Flash Video (SWF, FLV), DV, AMV, MTV, NUT, H.264/MPEG-4, MJPEG, H.265/HEVC, SVG, WebP, GIF	MP3/MP2, WMA, M4A, AAC, FLAC, Ogg, RealAudio, VOC, WAV, AC3, AIFF, MPA, AU, Monkey's Audio, CUE, CDA	BMP, JPEG, PNG, PSD, GIF, ICO, CUR, SVG

Export formats
PC	Web	iPhone/iPad	DVD	Mobile	PSP	Xbox	MP3/MP4
AMV, MPG, QuickTime File Format (.mov), WMV, Matroska (.mkv), RealMedia, SWF, Flash Video	for social networks including YouTube, Instagram, Facebook, Twitter, Vimeo, as well as MP4, WebM, FlashVideo, SWF, GIF, APNG	M4V	DVD, VCD, AVI, MPG	3GP, 3G2, MP4, RM	PSP	WMV, AVI, MP4, DVD	MP4, AMV, MTV

== See also ==
- List of video editing software
