= Pinnacle Systems =

Manufacturer of digital video hardware and software

Pinnacle Systems, Inc.
- Type: Public
- Industry: Digital video
- Founded: 1986; 40 years ago
- Founders: Ajay Chopra; Randall Moore; Mirek Jiricka
- Headquarters: Sunnyvale, California, United States
- Products: See § Products
- Parent: Avid Technology (2005–2012); Corel (2012–present)

Pinnacle Systems, Inc., was an American manufacturer of digital video hardware and software for the mainstream and broadcast markets. Pinnacle was a pioneer of using computer workstations for video production and was the top player in the burgeoning field of digital video effects units for a number of years in the 1990s. The company was founded in 1986 in California by Ajay Chopra (CEO), Mirek Jiricka, and Randall Moore.

== History ==
Logo used before acquisition by Avid Technology

Pinnacle Systems was founded in Sunnyvale, California, in 1986 by Ajay Chopra, Mirek Jiricka, and Randall Moore. Chopra, Pinnacle's principal founder, landed his first job in the computer industry with Burroughs Corporation in the late 1970s, shortly after graduating from Stony Brook University. He later worked for Atari, Inc., as a systems architect for its 8-bit line of computers. In 1983, he left Atari to join Mindset Corporation as a engineering manager, a computer manufacturer founded by ex-Atari employees which was deep into development of a graphical workstation based on the IBM PC's architecture. The Mindset computer was released in 1984 to high praise in the press but middling sales. The Mindset did find a niche in video production studios, who used the computer as a cheap digital video effects unit and character generator. As a result, Mindset Corporation established a video division, naming Chopra as its leader, but this by itself was not enough to save the company from filing bankruptcy in 1985.

After the demise of the Mindset, Chopra formed the basis of Pinnacle in 1986 as his first independent venture into digital video hardware. Joined in its foundation was Mirek Juricka and Randy Moore, both also formerly of Mindset and Atari. At the 1986 SMPTE convention in Los Angeles, the trio showed off hardware prototypes for their character generator and a DVE workstation to intense interest from attendees. Within a year, they raised $1 million in venture capital and raised manufacturing lines for their first products. By 1994, Pinnacle had reached $10 million in annual sales and was the top player in the field of digital video effects units. In November that year, the company went public after filing its initial public offering.

The late 1990s were marked by an acquisition spree for Pinnacle. In 1997, Pinnacle purchased Miro Digital Video Products of Germany for around $21 million. In 1999, Pinnacle acquired RasterOps, once their largest rival in the DVE business (who themselves had acquired another big player by the name of Truevision and adopted their name in 1992), for $14 million. In 2001, Pinnacle purchased the video editing business of FAST MultiMedia AG of Munich for $15 million; a year later, they purchased VOB Computersysteme GmbH for $7 million. In 2003, Pinnacle purchased Steinberg, a major vendor of digital audio workstations, for roughly $24 million ($8 million in cash and $15.8 million in stock)—only to sell it off to Yamaha in 2004 for $28.5 million.

Pinnacle itself was subsequently acquired by American company Avid Technology in March 2005 in a stock swap valuated at $462 million. The acquisition was finalized in May 2005. Avid subsequently sold Pinnacle products to Corel Corporation in July 2012.

== Products ==
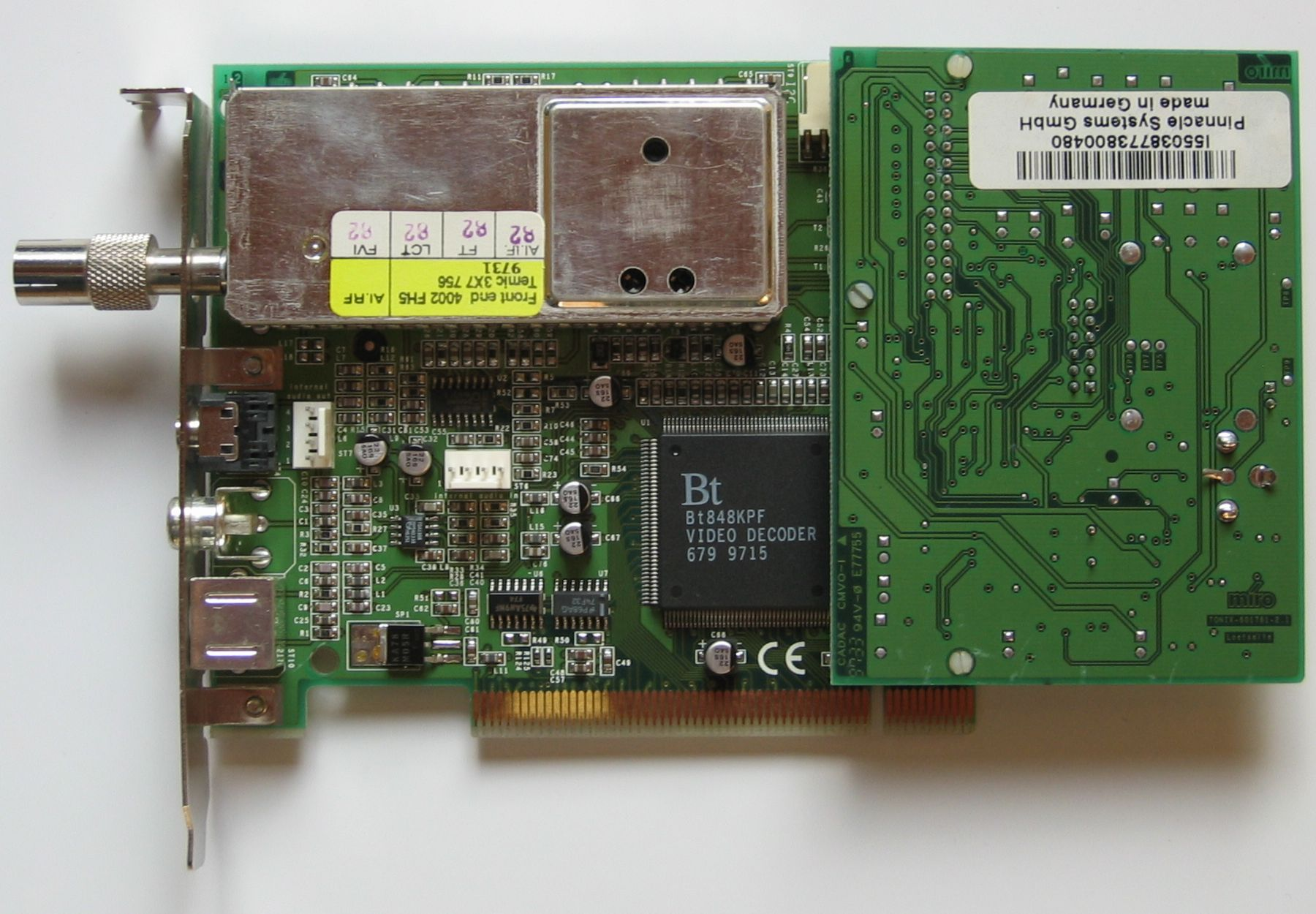
PCTVpro

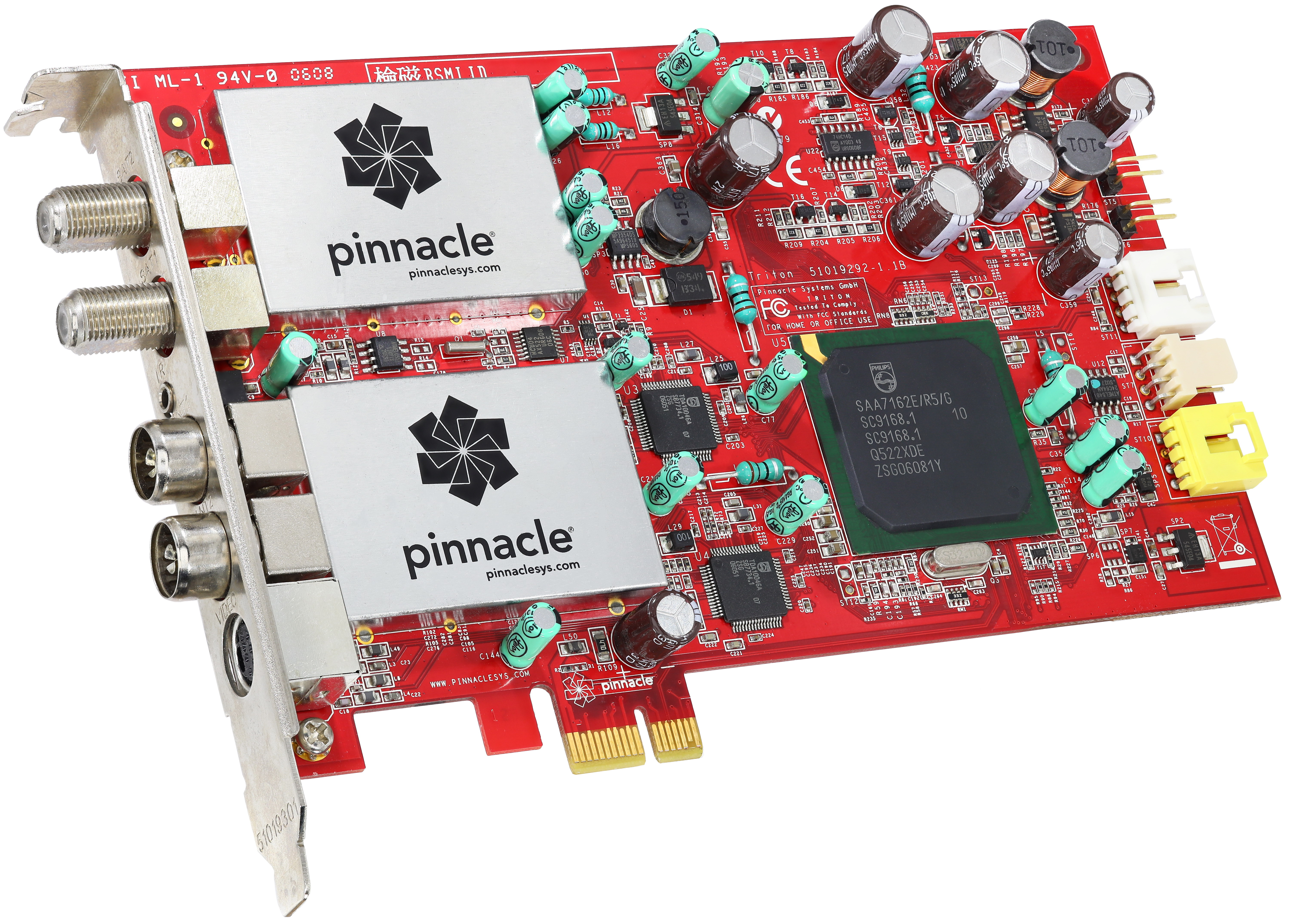
PCTV 7010iX

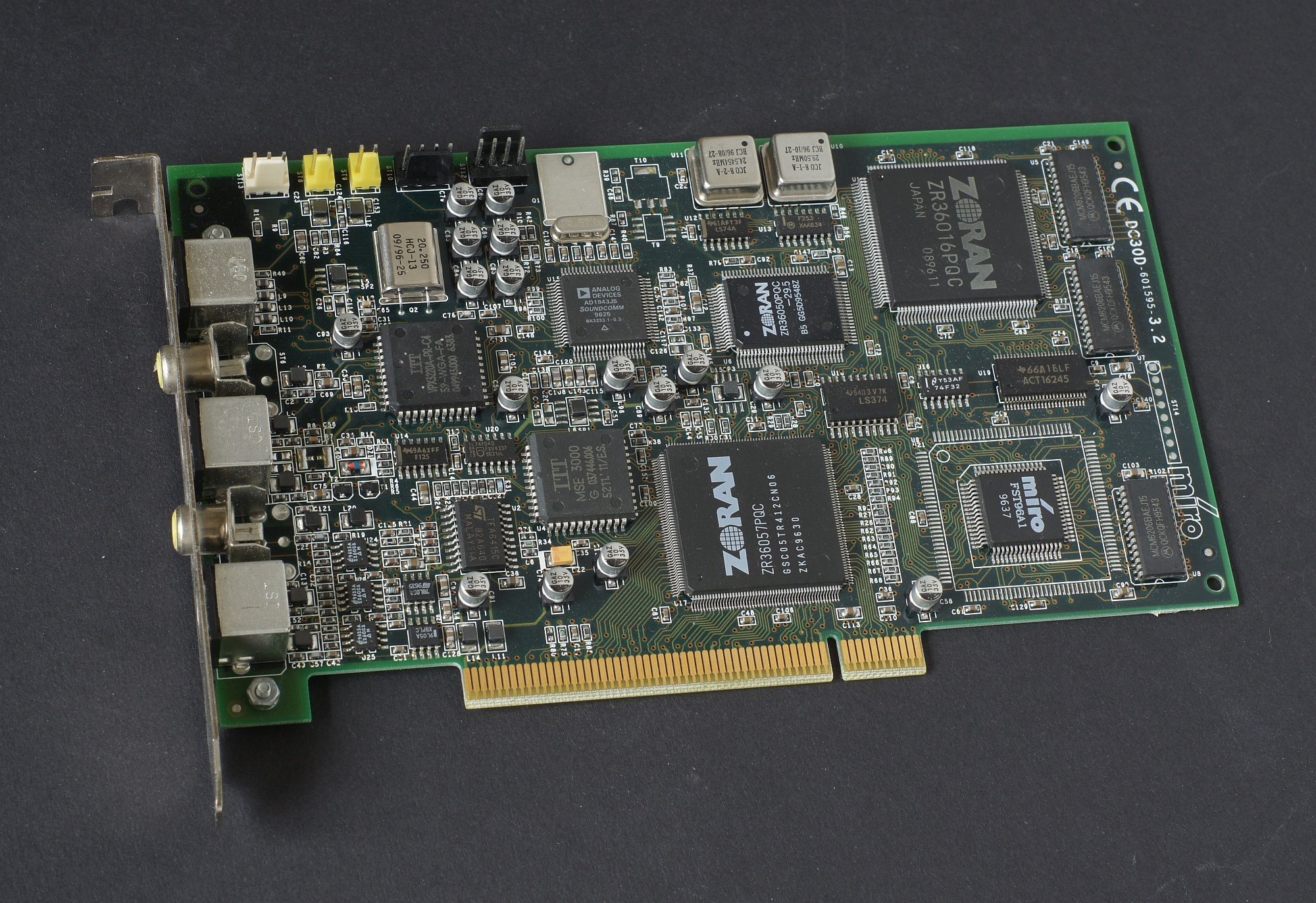
Miro Video DC30

Pinnacle products include:

- Pinnacle Studio
- Dazzle
- VideoSpin (Windows)
- Groovy Music City
- Mobile Media Converter
- Instant DVD Recorder
- Video Capture for Mac
- Avid Liquid

On-air graphics products now under Avid brand:

- Deko character generators
- MediaStream servers
- Lightning still stores
- Thunder video servers

Divested products:

- PCTV (now owned by Hauppauge Digital)
- TV for Mac (now owned by Hauppauge Digital)

Discontinued products:

- SoundBridge
- Profiler
- TVCenter PRO
- Video Transfer
- PDS Video Switcher
- ShowCenter
- Miro Video DC10
- Miro Video DC10plus
- Miro Video DC30
- Miro Video DC30plus
- Pro-ONE
- DC1000
- DC2000
- DV500
