= LoiLoScope =

Video editing software for Windows

LoiLoScope is a video editing software for Windows developed by LoiLo, a software firm based in Kanagawa, Japan. The company was founded by 2 brothers, Koji & Ryutaro Sugiyama. Having both worked in the game industry, the brothers used video game technology to develop the base technology of LoiLoScope.

== Technology ==
LoiLo video editing software uses the GPU to accelerate video playback and editing. This allows the software to edit HD videos, like AVCHD format, quickly without having to wait for each individual video to render before editing. The intuitive interface allows the user to navigate the software with relative ease. Instead of the traditional video editing layout, the company has gone with a "game-like" interface where you can graphically arrange your video clips.

== Products ==
=== LoiLoScope ===
The main product of LoiLo inc. It uses their GPU technologies for fast video editing, and claims of encoding time of up to 10 times faster than the competition. This software is available for the Windows operating system, with no Mac version currently available.

=== LoiLo Touch ===
A version of Super LoiLoScope, optimized for use on the multi-touch feature on Windows 7. The software is generally the same as Super LoiLoScope, with the only changes being some minor adjustments to the user interface, to make it more touch friendly.

=== Smooth ===
A plugin for Adobe After Effects that smooths out the rough edges that are created when animations are made.

=== Bundled versions ===
LoiLo has customized their software to be included with bundled with cameras:

==== LoiLoScope EX ====
Bundled with JVC Picsio (GC-FM2 & GC-WP10) pocket camcorders. The software is loaded on to the memory of the camera and is booted, when the camera is plugged into a PC via USB.
