= MPEG Video Wizard DVD =

Non-linear video editing software

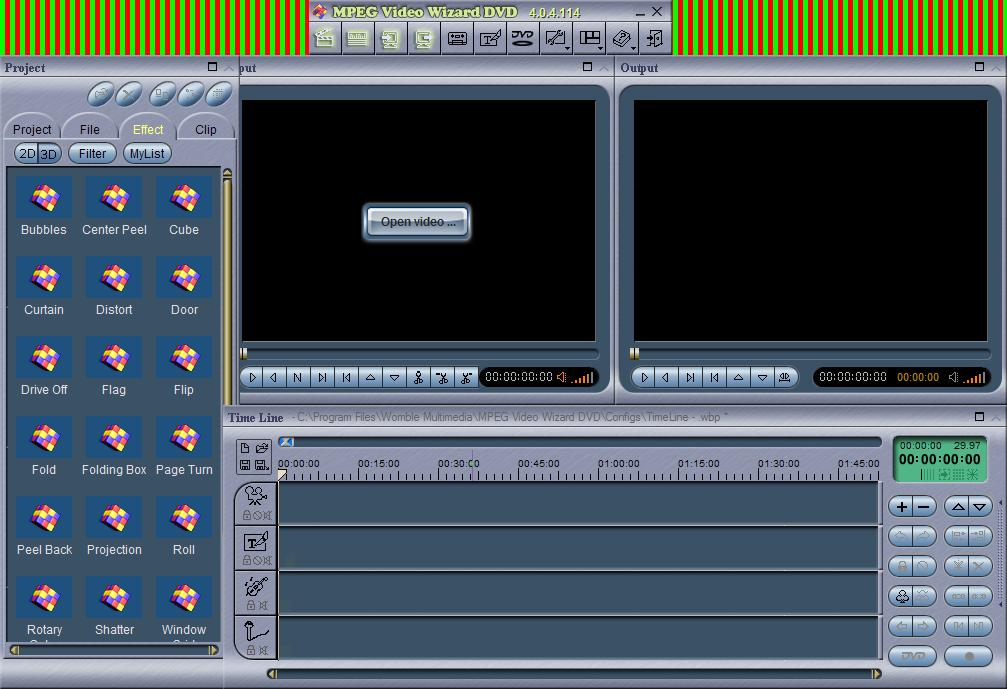
The MPEG Video Wizard DVD when first opened up.

MPEG Video Wizard DVD, also known as MVW-DVD, is a non-linear video editing software developed by Womble Multimedia, Inc.. It allows users to edit video content, create DVDs with menus and then burn them without the need for any additional software.

== Features ==
- Multi-track timeline editing
- HD MPEG editing with frame accuracy and smart rendering
- Ad detection and removal
- VOB editing and MP4 export support
- Many special effects and filters
- DVD Reader tool to import DVD video via IFO data.
- Extensible menu templates
- Shrink DVD size to fit onto different media
- DVD and ISO burning
- Export DVDs with nonstandard image format
- Microsoft Windows 7 Support

== Supported file formats ==
- Video: AVI, MPG, MPV, DAT, VOB, VBS, VRO, TS, TP, M2T, MTS, M2TS, WMV, ASF, RM, RMVB.
- Audio: WAV, MP3, MP2, MPA, AC3, WMA.
- Image: BMP, JPEG, GIF, WMF, ICO.
