= Nero Video =

Video editing software

- Video editing area of Nero Vision Xtra
- Developer: Nero AG
- Initial release: 12 April 2010
- Stable release: 2025 / 9 October 2024; 19 months ago
- Operating system: Windows 10 (32/64-bit), Windows 7 SP1 Home Premium, Professional or Ultimate (32/64-bit), Windows 8 (32/64-bit), Windows 8.1 (32/64-bit)
- Available in: Available in multiple languages
- Type: video editing software
- License: proprietary
- Website: www.nero.com/eng/products/nero-video/

Nero Video (known as Nero Vision until 15 October 2011) is a video editing software from Nero AG that provides simple editing functions (in Express mode) as well as advanced video editing (Advanced mode), which includes multitrack timeline and key framing functions. Nero Video also provides a wide range of functions for including photos and music in video projects, as well as a broad selection of transition, video, audio and title effects. In addition, it includes templates for semi-automatic film creation and for picture-in-picture effects. Once editing is complete, users can export their finished film as a file or upload it to the web. They can also use Nero Video to burn the film onto DVDs and Blu-rays and personalize the discs’ menu and chapters step by step. Video disc creation is a separate module and can be executed directly from the start screen. That enables users to complete their disc-only projects quickly and easily. This authoring module also includes simple cropping and arranging tools.

== Development ==
The software demonstrates significant technical progress with each new version.

=== Nero Vision 4 ===
In the first version, Nero Vision 4, users were already able to edit videos in a small template and had a fixed choice per film of one video channel, one effect channel, one text channel and two audio channels. They could not add images to their film at that time and could only edit menus in an automatic template.

=== Nero Vision 5 ===
In this version, Nero added HD capability. Although the menu areas included more templates, there were no major innovations in this version.

=== Nero 9 ===
The third version of the software included manual menu editing to enable the creation of additional submenus. This version also included the ability to add images to videos.

=== Nero Vision Xtra ===
This version was much more extensive and included multitrack editing, as well as a refreshed look and feel. Nero added multiple new effects to this version, as well as optional key frames on the timeline, helping users to vary things like the image size or effects during the film. The menu editing remained more or less unchanged, although users could now also burn their film to Blu-ray discs.

=== Nero Video 11 ===
This version saw a name change to Nero Video and its major new feature was the Express mode, which allowed easy yet full-functioned video editing in a simplified timeline. It also included Express Effects, a range of predefined effect templates that users could drag and drop onto their clips. Nero also completely redesigned the start screen and simplified imports of AVCHD media. Older effects were split off into separate functions and new sound effects were added.

=== Nero Video 12 ===
This version introduced several new effects, such as slow motion, time-lapse, image stabilization, and retro designs.

=== Nero Video 2014 ===
This version saw the addition of Nero Tilt-Shift effects and Nero RhythmSnap. Nero also added a drag and drop function to the start screen, enabling users to get started on video or disc projects faster. In addition, this version introduced 4K video and slide show editing capabilities.

=== Nero Video 2015 ===
Along with typeface and font style enhancements, this version includes animated text effect templates, and the ability for users to create their own text effect templates. Moreover, the function to change the disc output format on the fly was introduced in the authoring module.

=== Nero Video 2016 ===
Along with typeface and font style enhancements, this version includes animated text effect templates, more text effects, and the ability for users to create their own text effect templates. Furthermore, the version offer full 4K support: 4K Video playback, 4k Video footage and more.

=== Nero Video 2017 ===
Along with typeface and font style enhancements, this version includes 4K Video templates and Video effects, and the ability for users to create their own text effect templates. Furthermore, with this Version you can Play Videos with embedded subtitles and drag and drop extra ones to the Playback functions. You can also export several single Videos from Long Videos in one go.

=== Nero Video 2024 ===
It's easier to create a template from scratch and set up a Nero Creative Center to download 50+ video templates. Then, apply the photo and video. You can quickly open Nero Motion Tracker on your Nero Video when you want to start tracking an object. This doesn’t have to be a moving face or car; you can track anything.

Nero Video 2025

Nero Video 2025 introduces AI image editing integrated with Nero PhotoSnap and a streamlined click-and-drag clip replacement feature.

=== Product versions ===
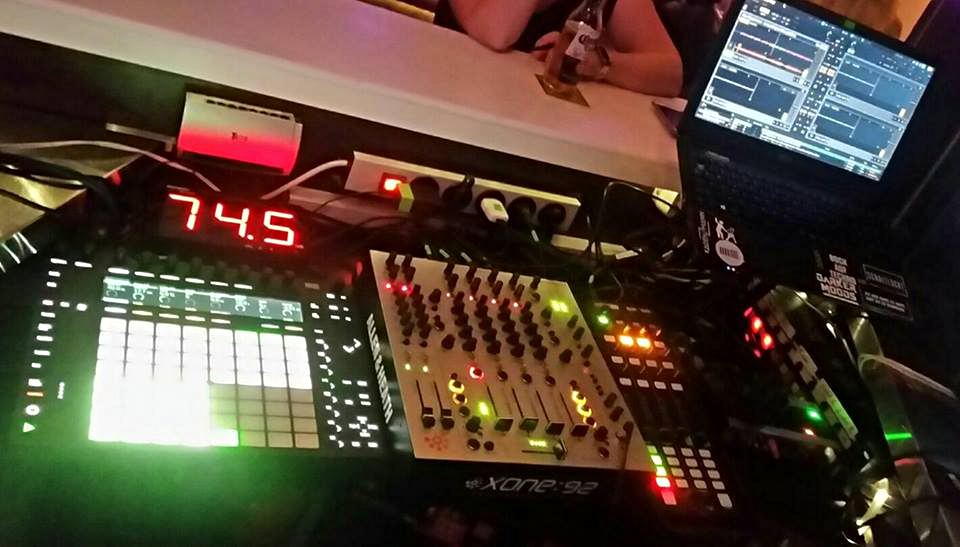
Nero Vision Hybrid-Setup, 2018

Nero Video is a part of Nero 2017 Classic, Nero 2017 Platinum, Nero Video 2017. With the exception of the version included in Nero 2017 Classic, where there are slightly fewer effects and templates, and no 4K editing, all versions of Nero Video in the other products are identical. All products also include Nero MediaHome.

Nero MediaHome enables users to more easily manage and play their images, videos and music files. Alongside audio CD ripping and the creation of playlists and slideshows, MediaHome includes important features that let users sort their media, including tagging, face recognition in photos, geo location support and manual geotagging for photos and videos. Streaming to TVs and home media players is also included. Starting with Version 2015, users can stream media directly to their mobile devices (iOS, Android, Amazon) with the Nero MediaHome Receiver App.
