= Pinnacle Studio =

Video editing software

- Developer: Pinnacle Systems
- Stable release: 26.0.1.181 / December 8, 2024; 21 months ago
- Operating system: Windows 7, Windows 8, Windows 8.1, Windows 10, iOS
- Type: Video editing software
- License: Commercial proprietary software
- Website: pinnaclesys.com

Pinnacle Studio is a video editing program originally developed by Pinnacle Systems as consumer-level software. Upon Pinnacle System's acquisition of Munich-based FAST Multimedia, Pinnacle integrated the professional code base of FAST's editing software, (since re-branded as Pinnacle Liquid) beginning with Pinnacle Studio version 10. It was acquired by Avid and later by Corel in July 2012. Pinnacle Studio allows users to author video content in Video CD, DVD-Video, AVCHD or Blu-ray format, add complementary menus and burn them to disc.

In the second half of 2007, Pinnacle introduced VideoSpin, a shareware version of Studio with fewer features; it was discontinued in March 2009.

== Versions ==
Since version 9, Studio has been sold in several editions: Studio, Studio Plus and Studio Ultimate (starting in version 11), all of which are commercial software. There is some additional functionality in the Plus and Ultimate editions, notably a second video track. This allowed Overlay, A-B Edits, Chroma Key, and Picture-in-Picture.

Pinnacle Studio 24 was released on August 11, 2020. This version included Unlimited tracks plus 4K video support, Multi-camera Editing, Enhanced Motion Tracking, Enhanced Video masking, and many advanced technical features. No support for HEVC (H.265) on AMD hardware.

=== iOS ===
In addition to the desktop versions of Pinnacle Studio, two versions of Pinnacle Studio also exists for iPad and iPhone - Pinnacle Studio for iOS and Pinnacle Studio Pro for iOS. Last one has additional features, for example, trim frame by frame using the Dual Viewer Precision Trimmer, export to cloud services (such as Dropbox, Google Drive and OneDrive). Last version of Pinnacle Studio for iOS (5.6.1) requires iOS 9.3 or later, iPad 2 or higher, iPhone 4s or higher, iPod Touch Series 5 or higher.

== Reception ==
MacUser rated version Pinnacle Studio 4 for iOS as 4 out of 5, saying that it provides "a more fully featured movie editor than iMovie for iPad", but complained that the extra in-app purchase needed for cloud sync was excessive.

== See also ==
- Comparison of video editing software
