= VideoThang =

- Final release: 2.1.0 / 2008; 17 years ago
- Operating system: Windows 2000 or later
- Type: Video editing software
- License: Freeware

VideoThang was free video editing software for Windows 2000, XP, and Vista. The software has three parts to it which are My Stuff, Edit My Stuff, and My Mix. The software accepts MOV, AVI, MPG, MP4, PNG, WMV, FLV, and MP3 standards. Its official website is now no longer available.

== Reception ==
Jan Ozer, of Pcmag, said that the software "suffers from several unfortunate design and implementation flaws that dramatically limit output quality and overall utility." Jon L. Jacobi, of PC World, said that the software "may not be the most flexible multimedia editor in the world, but the trim/zoom basics are there, it's free, and it's so simple to use that just about anyone in the world should be able figure it out." Amit Agarwal, of Digital Inspiration, said that the software "doesn’t offer loads of features like other video editors but is perfect for making quick video slideshows of your pictures that you can upload on the web or share via email."
