= ArcSoft ShowBiz =

Video editing software

ShowBiz
- ShowBiz
- Developer: ArcSoft
- Stable release: 2.1.9.67
- Operating system: Windows
- Type: Video editor
- License: Proprietary
- Website: http://www.arcsoft.com/showbiz/

ShowBiz is a video editor by ArcSoft for the Windows operating system. It can create VCD and DVDs and can also export to the formats AVI, MPEG, WMV, and MOV. ShowBiz also contains a DVD burning and menu building feature.

As of 2003, it was one of the three most dominant bundled titles.

== Reception ==
- PC Magazine reviewer Jan Ozer states: "ArcSoft's ShowBiz has evolved into a competent editor that's generally more usable than Dazzle's MovieStar program, providing more configuration controls, better preview features, and a much greater range of fun effects."
- John Virata, senior editor of Digital Media Online, says in his three page review of ShowBiz DVD 2, "It is an easy editor to work with and has a logically laid out interface that takes you step by step through the video creation and DVD creation process"
