= WeVideo =

Video editing platform

- Company type: Private
- Website type: Video editing software as a service
- Available in: English
- Founded: April 2011
- Headquarters: Mountain View, California
- CEO: Kevin Knight
- Website: wevideo.com
- Launched: September 2011
- Current status: Active

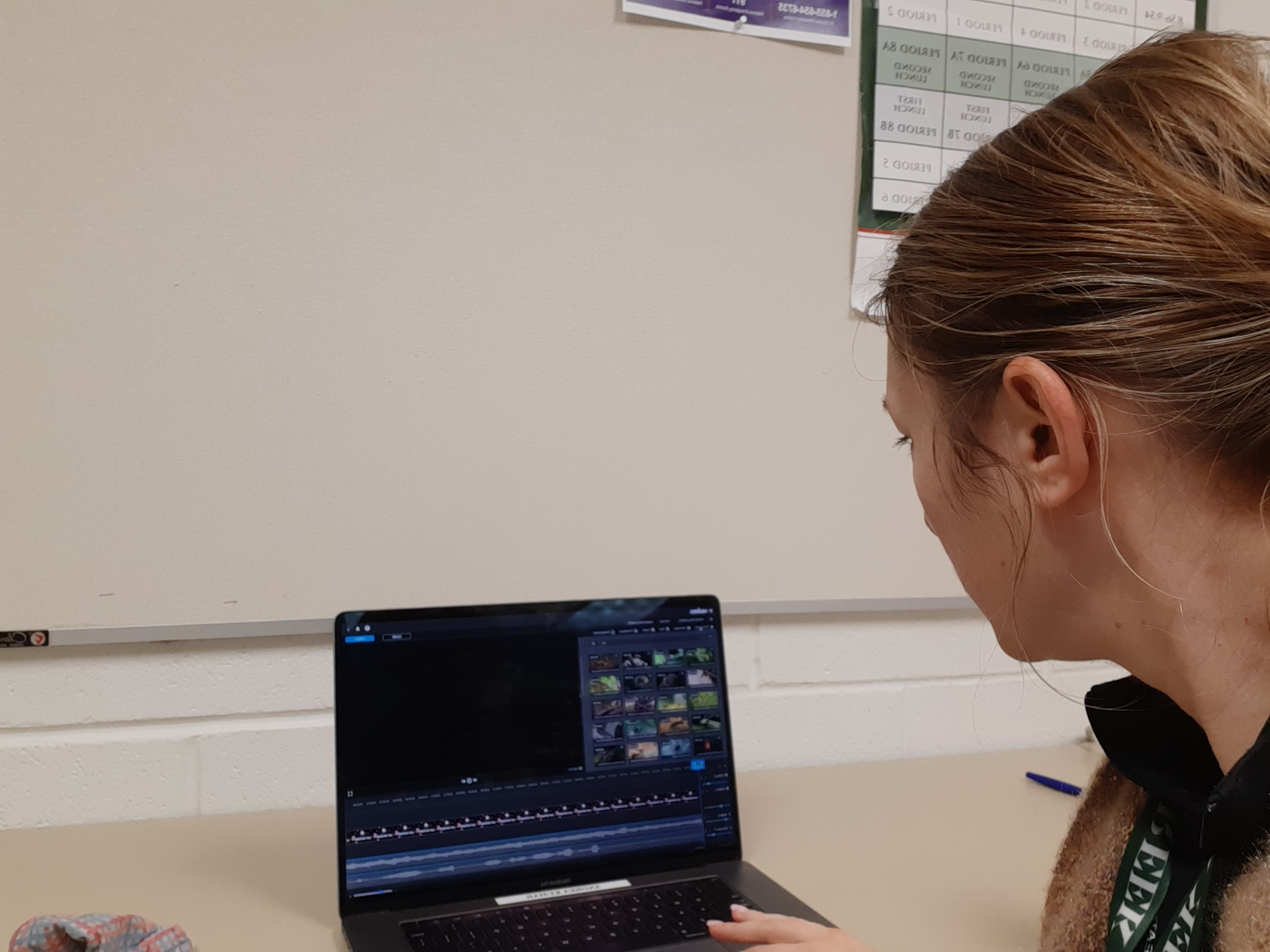
When editing in WeVideo, users can import photos, photography, and audio files, or choose from a variety of professional stock film, photography and audio files to enhance video projects.

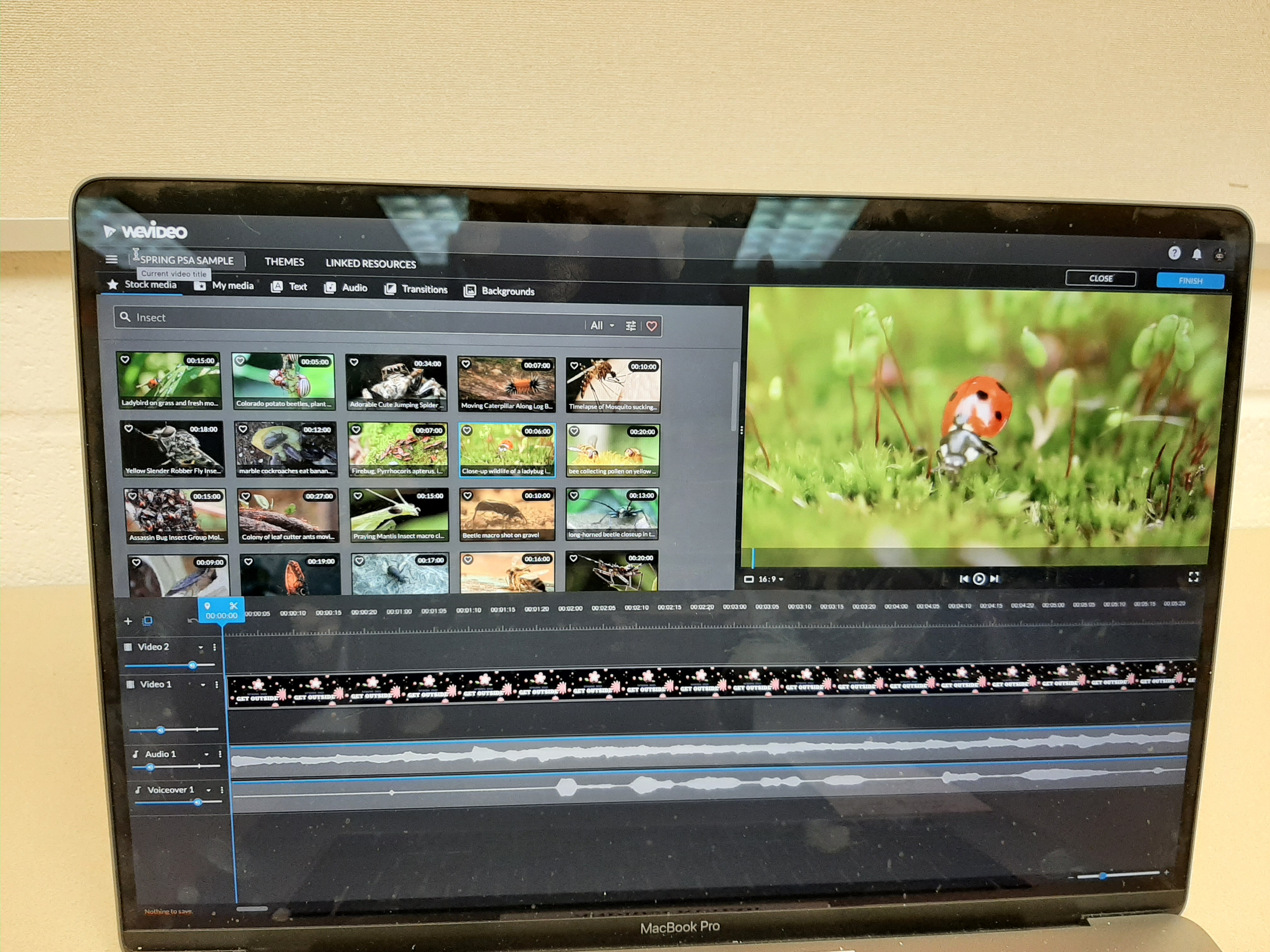
WeVideo allows users to search for professional stock film, photography and audio files to use in video, screencasts, and audio projects.

WeVideo is an online, cloud-based video editing platform that works in web browsers and on mobile devices (Android and iOS). The company was originally founded in 2011 in Norway, their main headquarters is in Mountain View, California with a team based in Romania.

== History ==
WeVideo Inc. was founded under the name of Creaza, Inc., an online creative toolbox used by children throughout Europe. WeVideo publicly launched its services in September 2011, changing its name to avoid any confusion with Creaza Education.

=== Services ===
WeVideo offers subscription-based services for video editing to both commercial and educational markets.
