= Kino (software) =

Linux video editor

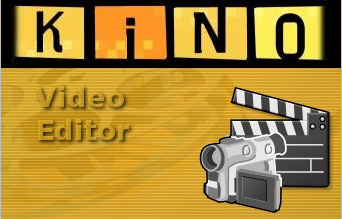

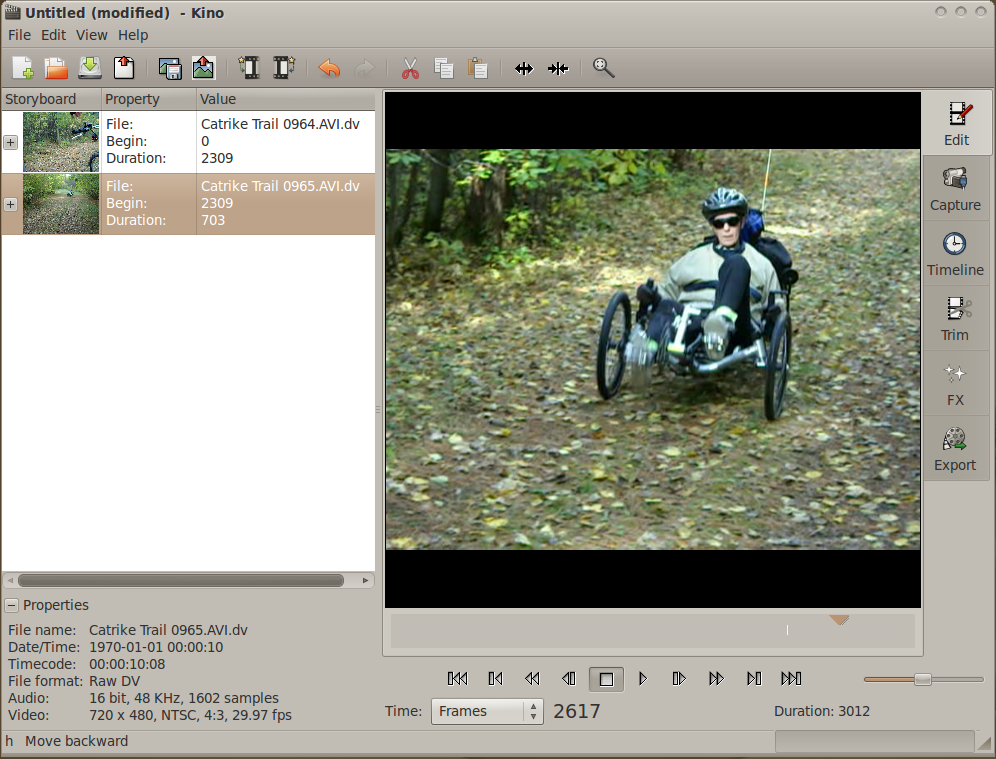
- Kino 1.3.4
- Written in: C, C++
- Operating system: Unix-like
- Type: Video editor
- License: GPL-2.0-or-later
- Website: sourceforge.net/projects/kino/ kinodv.org

Kino is a discontinued free software GTK+-based video editing software application for Linux and other Unix-like operating systems. The development of Kino was started at the end of 2000 by Dan Dennedy and Arne Schirmacher. The project's aim was: "Easy and reliable DV editing for the Linux desktop with export to many usable formats." The program supported many basic and detailed audio/video editing and assembling tasks.

Kino has been included in several Linux distributions, including Debian, Puppy Linux and Ubuntu. BSD ports are also available.

Development towards major feature implementations in Kino was slowed due to the lead developer, Dan Dennedy's inclination towards the development of Media Lovin' Toolkit. Dennedy indicated when he released Kino 1 that he was returning to work on the MLT Framework to support Kdenlive (another Linux non-linear digital video editor), "since its latest version shows much promise".

As of August 5, 2013, the official website for Kino indicated that the project is "dead" and that users should try alternative software.

== Features ==
Kino can import raw DV-AVI and DV files, as well as capture footage from digital camcorders using the raw1394 and dv1394 libraries. It can also import (as well as export) multiple still frames as JPEG, PNG, TIFF, PPM, and others image file types. Kino has the ability to export to camcorders using the ieee1394 or video1394 libraries. Kino can also export audio as WAV, Ogg Vorbis, MP3 using LAME, or MP2. Using FFmpeg, Kino can export audio/video as MPEG-1, MPEG-2, and MPEG-4 and is integrated with DVD Video authoring utilities.

Some features included in version 1.3.4 include: capture from FireWire (IEEE 1394) cameras, fast and frame-accurate navigation/scrubbing, vi keybindings, storyboard view with drag-n-drop, trimmer with 3 point insert editing, fine-grain thumbnail viewer, support for jog shuttle USB devices, drag-n-drop from file manage, Undo/Redo up to 99X.

Kino provides a range of audio and video effects and transitions. Audio effects include silence, fade in/out, gain envelope, dub (from file), mix (from file), and crossfading support. Video effects include black/white, sepia tone, multiple colour balance and masking tools, reverse (i.e. inverse or negative), mirror, kaleidescope, swap (flip), fade to/from black, blur (triangle), soft focus, titler and pixelate. Transitions include fade to/from colour dissolve, push wipe, barn door wipe, colour differences, and extensible wipes with numerous common SMPTE wipes (box, bar, diagonal, barn door, clock, matrix, four box, iris, and checkerboard).

== Release history ==
Version	Release date	Significant changes
Kino 1.0.0	March 12, 2007	New blip.tv uploading feature for movies and still frames; Fixed audio handling on big endian CPU architectures; Improved generic video import script when using mencoder: faster, no bulky intermediate file, less compatibility problem between mencoder and FFmpeg; Added support for X-Keys Editor USB Jog/Shuttle; Added support for Jog/Shuttle to FX; The USB Jog/Shuttle hotplug integration was changed to use udev.; Added private copy of FFmpeg source code for static linking with new configure options. This option builds a statically linked, kino-specific version of the ffmpeg transcode utility named 'ffmpeg-kino' that is invoked by the Kino import script.; Updated Italian translation; Bugfixes
Kino 1.1.0	July 23, 2007	Heavily updated English user manual; Major performance improvement in player engine when frame dropping enabled; Updated export scripts to improve compatibility; New Catalan translation; Bugfixes
Kino 1.3.0	February 24, 2008	Updated export scripts for FFmpeg changes (x264, mp3); Improved speed on SMP systems by enabling FFmpeg multi-threaded codecs; Improved import (DV conversion) progress dialog; Added quality level option and gstreamer-based Ogg Theora to the blip.tv publishing script; Updated Hungarian translation

== Reception ==
In reviewing Kino 1.3.4 in January 2012 Terry Hancock of Free Software Magazine found that the application was only suitable for simple or very limited video editing tasks. He praised its simplicity and ease-of-learning even for users new to video editing, but criticised its lack of multi-track capabilities and described the process of adding background music or synchronizing new sounds as "laborious". He concluded: "I'd say it was basically up to editing home movies to get rid of the boring parts. I've also found it useful for mining old public-domain videos from the Internet Archive to extract useful snippets of video. This, plus its ease of use, make it a valuable niche application, but certainly not for any serious video project".

== See also ==
- Comparison of video editing software
- List of video editing software
- Kdenlive
