= Flowblade =

Free and open-source video editing software

Flowblade Movie Editor

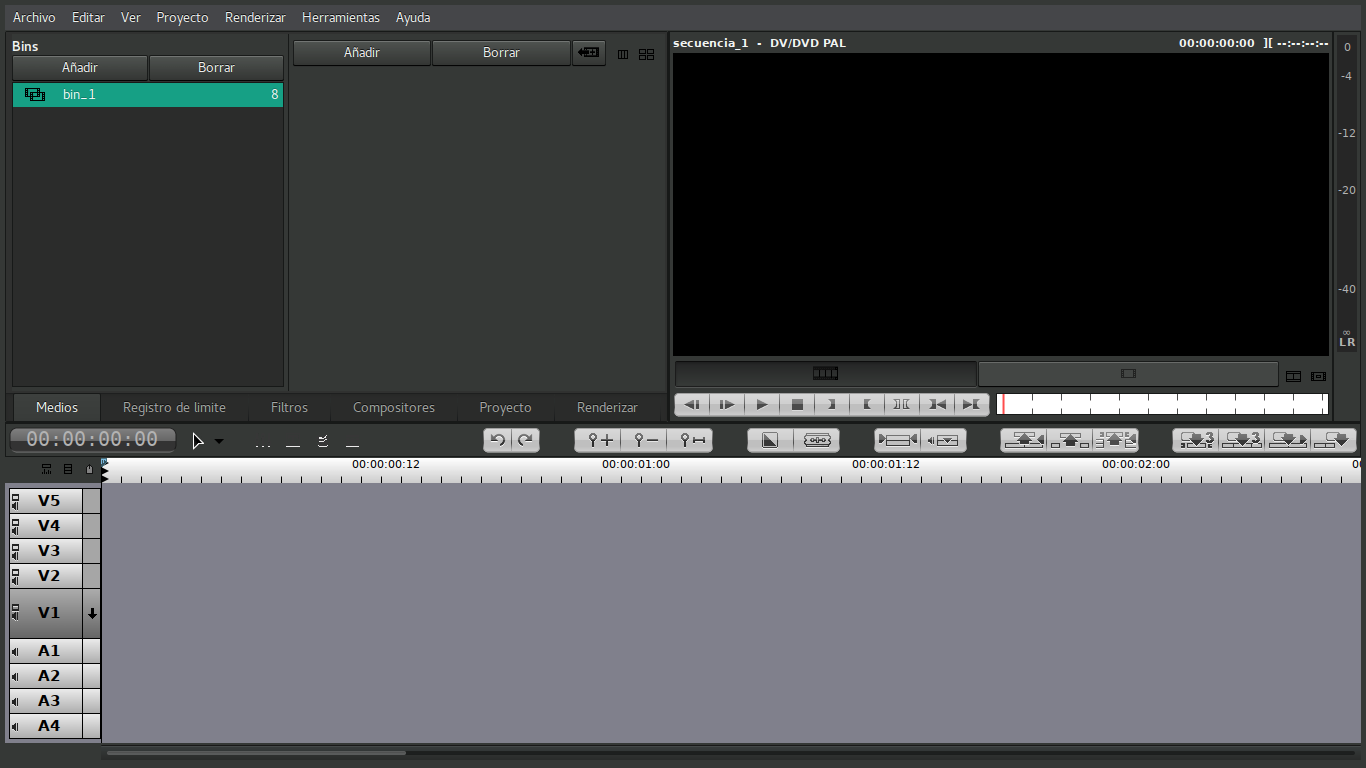
- Developers: Janne Liljeblad and other contributors.
- Stable release: 2.24 / 6 December 2025; 19 days ago
- Repository: github.com/jliljebl/flowblade
- Written in: Python (GTK)
- Operating system: Linux
- Type: Video editing software
- License: GPL-3.0-or-later
- Website: jliljebl.github.io/flowblade/

Flowblade Movie Editor is a free and open-source video editing software for Linux.

The project was started by lead developer Janne Liljeblad in 2009 and has been active since. The source code is currently hosted on GitHub.

Flowblade employs a film-style insert editing model as workflow with similar design approach as Avid. In insert editing clips are generally placed tightly after other clips when they are inserted on the Timeline. Edits are fine tuned by trimming in and out points of clips or by cutting and deleting parts of clips.

Flowblade builds most of its functionality using media framework MLT. Other MLT video editors are KDEnlive and Shotcut.

Other used libraries include Frei0r effects and LADSPA. Flowblade supports all of the formats supported by FFmpeg or libav (such as QuickTime, AVI, WMV, MPEG, and Flash Video, among others), and also supports 4:3 and 16:9 aspect ratios for both PAL, NTSC and various HD standards, including HDV and AVCHD.

== Features list ==
- Editing with 4 move tools, 3 trim tools, 4 methods to add clips on the Timeline and drag'n'drop functionality. Max.9 combined video and audio tracks available.
- Image compositing with 6 compositors and mix, zoom, move and rotate animations capability.
- Image and audio filtering with 50+ image filters and 30+ audio filters.
- Supported editable media types include most common video and audio formats, depending on installed MLT/FFMPEG codecs, bitmap and vector graphics and numbered frame sequences.
- Built-in title tool.
- G'MIC effects tool
- Unlimited keyframing for animatable clip attributes.
- Output encoding can done to most common video and audio formats
- User interface has been translated to several languages, including Spanish, French, Italian, Hungarian and German.

== See also ==
- List of video editing software
