= Theora =

Free lossy video compression format

- Filename extension: .ogv, .ogg
- Internet media type: video/ogg
- Developed by: Xiph.Org Foundation
- Initial release: 1 June 2004
- Latest release: Theora I 3 June 2017
- Type of format: Video coding format
- Contained by: Ogg, Matroska
- Extended from: VP3
- Standard: Specification
- Open format?: Yes
- Free format?: Yes
- Website: theora.org

libtheora
- Developer: Xiph.Org Foundation
- Release: 3 November 2008 (1.0)
- Stable release: 1.2.0 / 29 March 2025; 19 months ago
- Preview release: 1.2.0 Beta 1 / 16 March 2025; 19 months ago
- Written in: C
- Operating system: Unix-like (incl Linux, Mac OS X), Windows
- Type: Video codec, reference implementation
- License: 3-clause BSD
- Website: www.theora.org

Theora is a free lossy video compression format. It was developed by the Xiph.Org Foundation and distributed without licensing fees alongside their other free and open media projects, including the Vorbis audio format and the Ogg container.

The libtheora video codec is the reference implementation of the Theora video compression format developed by the Xiph.Org Foundation.

Theora was derived from the formerly proprietary VP3 codec, released into the public domain by On2 Technologies. It is broadly comparable in design and bitrate efficiency to MPEG-4 Part 2, early versions of Windows Media Video, and RealVideo while it lacked some of the features present in some of these other codecs. It is comparable in open standards philosophy to the BBC's Dirac codec.

Theora was named after Theora Jones, Edison Carter's Controller on the Max Headroom television program.

== Technical details ==
Theora is a variable-bitrate, DCT-based video compression scheme. Like most common video codecs, Theora used chroma subsampling, block-based motion compensation and an 8-by-8 DCT block. Pixels are grouped into various structures, namely blocks, super blocks, and macroblocks. Theora supports intra-coded frames ("keyframes") and forward-predictive frames, but not bi-predictive frames which are found in H.264 and VC-1. Theora also does not support interlacing, or bit-depths larger than 8 bits per component.

Theora video streams can be stored in any suitable container format, but they are most commonly found in the Ogg container with Vorbis or FLAC audio streams. This combination provided a completely open, royalty-free multimedia format. It can also be used with the Matroska container.

The Theora video-compression format is compatible with the VP3 video-compression format, which consisted of a backward-compatible superset. Theora is a superset of VP3, and VP3 streams (with some minor syntactic modifications) can be converted into Theora streams without recompression (but not vice versa). VP3 video compression can be decoded using Theora implementations, but Theora video compression usually cannot be decoded using old VP3 implementations.

== History ==
Theora's predecessor On2 TrueMotion VP3 was originally a proprietary and patent-encumbered video codec developed by On2 Technologies. VP3.1 was introduced in May 2000 and followed three months later by the VP3.2 release, which was the basis for Theora.

=== Move to free software ===
In August 2001, On2 Technologies announced that they would release an open source version of their VP3.2 video compression algorithm. In September 2001, On2 Technologies published the source code of the VP3.2 codec under the VP3.2 Public License 0.1, a custom open-source license. The license only granted the right to modify the source code if the resultant larger work continued to support playback of VP3.2 data.

In March 2002, On2 responded to the public's reception by relicensing the VP3 codec under the GNU Lesser General Public License. In June 2002, On2 donated VP3 to the Xiph.Org Foundation and offered it under the Ogg Vorbis BSD-style license. On2 also made an irrevocable, royalty-free license grant for any patent claims it might have over the software and any derivatives, allowing anyone to use any VP3-derived codec for any purpose. In August 2002, On2 entered into an agreement with the Xiph.Org Foundation to make VP3 the basis of a new, free video codec, called Theora. On2 declared Theora to be VP3's successor. On 3 October 2002, On2 and Xiph announced the completion and availability of the initial alpha code release of libtheora, Theora's reference implementation.

There is no formal specification for VP3's bitstream format beyond the VP3 source code published by On2 Technologies. In 2003, Mike Melanson created an incomplete description of the VP3 bitstream format and decoding process at a higher level than source code, with some help from On2 and Xiph.Org Foundation. The Theora specification adopted some portions of this VP3 description.

A successor to Theora, Daala, was later merged into AV1.

=== Theora I specification ===
Example of a Theora video used on Wikipedia, showing a Polikarpov I-15 biplane at an aerobatic display.

The Theora I bitstream format was frozen in June 2004 after the libtheora 1.0alpha3 release. Videos encoded with any version of the libtheora since the alpha3 will be compatible with any future player. This is also true for videos encoded with any implementation of the Theora I specification since the format freeze. The Theora I Specification was completely published in 2004. Any later changes in the specification are minor updates.

The Theora reference implementation libtheora spent several years in alpha and beta status. The first alpha version was released on 25 September 2002 and the first beta version was released on 22 September 2007. The first stable release of libtheora was made in November 2008. Work then focused on improving the codec's performance in the "Thusnelda" branch, which was released as version 1.1 in September 2009 as the second stable libtheora release. This release brought some technical improvements and new features, such as the new rate control module and the two-pass rate control.

The codename for the next version of libtheora was Ptalarbvorm.

Theora was well established as a video format in open-source applications, and became the format used for Wikipedia's video content before being replaced by VP9. However, the proposed adoption of Theora as part of the baseline video support in HTML5 resulted in controversy.

=== Legacy ===
In October 2023, Google announced intent to remove Theora support from Chromium (finalizing removal by Google Chrome 123), with Firefox following suit. Google developers claimed that despite lack of adoption, Theora made a case for open and royalty-free codecs like AV1.

== Performance ==
=== Encoding performance ===
Evaluations of the VP3 and early Theora encoders found that their subjective visual quality was inferior to that of contemporary video codecs. The performance characteristics of the Theora 1.0 reference implementation are dominated mostly by implementation problems inherited from the original VP3 code base. Work that lead up to the 1.1 stable release focused on improving on or eliminating these. A May 2009 review of this work by Xiph developer Chris Montgomery claimed a considerable improvement in quality, both subjectively and as measured by PSNR, by improving the forward DCT and quantisation matrices. More recently however, Xiph developers compared the 1.1 Theora encoder to YouTube's H.264 and H.263+ encoders, in response to concerns raised in 2009 about Theora's inferior performance by Chris DiBona, a Google employee. They found the results from Theora to be nearly the same as YouTube's H.264 output, and much better than the H.263+ output.

The differences in quality, bitrate and file size between a YouTube H.264 video and a transcoded Ogg video file are very small.

=== Playback performance ===
There was an open-source VHDL code base for a hardware Theora decoder in development. It began as a 2006 Google Summer of Code project, and it has been developed on both the Nios II and LEON processors. However, there are no Theora decoder chips in production, and portable media players, smartphones and similar devices with limited computing power rely on such chips to provide efficient playback.

== Playback ==
=== Web browsers ===
As originally recommended by HTML 5, these browsers support Theora when embedded by the video element:

- Mozilla Firefox 3.5 and later versions including Firefox for mobile (Fennec). Theora was disabled by default in Firefox 126, and support may be removed in the future due to low usage.
- Google Chrome as of version 3.0.182.2 including Chromium as of 14 July 2009. Chrome 120 disabled support for Theora by default and the complete removal is expected in version 123.
- Tizen browser
- SeaMonkey as of version 2.0.
- Konqueror 4.4.2
- Opera as of version 10.50. It was also supported in Opera 9.5 experimental video builds. Stopped supporting Theora after version 107.
- GNOME Web uses WebKitGTK+ as its rendering engine. As WebKitGTK+ uses GStreamer to implement the HTML5 media player, and all the formats GStreamer supports (including Theora) are available in browser.
- Midori is another example of a browser that supports Theora by using WebKitGTK+.

=== Supporting media frameworks ===
- DirectShow with use of OpenCodecs
- GStreamer supported via Theora or FFmpeg module, supports GStreamer based applications e.g. Totem and Songbird
- Phonon
- QuickTime (including but not limited to Safari) with use of Xiph QuickTime Components

=== Supporting applications ===
- FFmpeg (own implementation)
- Helix Player
- Miro Media Player (formerly known as Democracy Player)
- MPlayer and front-ends
- Totem, Moovida and all GStreamer-based players
- VLC (native support)
- xine and all libxine-based players like Kaffeine
- Dragon Player and all Phonon-based players

== Encoding ==
There are several third-party programs that support encoding through libtheora:

Name	Description	Operating Systems Supported		
Name	Description	Unix-like	OS X	Windows
ffmpeg2theora	A command-line program that transcodes video by decoding with FFmpeg and reencoding with libtheora to encode it	Yes	Yes	Yes
VLC	Can transcode to single-pass Theora 1.0 and optionally stream it	Yes	Yes	Yes
FreeJ	"Video DJing" software that can encode to and stream Theora	Yes	Yes	?
Kdenlive	The video editor supplied with KDE	Yes	?	?
Pitivi	The video editor supplied with GNOME	Yes	?	?
LiVES	Video editing software for Linux. Can edit, encode and stream theora.	Yes	Yes	?
HandBrake	Can output to Theora only with the Matroska container	Yes	Yes	Yes
RecordMyDesktop	Records the screen to Ogg Theora with optional Vorbis audio	Yes	?	?

The libtheora library contains the reference implementation of the Theora specification for encoding and decoding. libtheora was developed by the Xiph.Org Foundation. The library was released under the terms of a BSD-style license.

Also, several media frameworks have support for Theora.

- The open-source ffdshow audio/video decoder is capable of encoding Theora videos using its Video for Windows (VFW) multi-codec interface within popular AVI editing programs. It supports both encoding and decoding Theora video streams and uses Theora's alpha 4 libraries. However, many of the more refined features of Theora are not available to the user in ffdshow's interface.
- The GStreamer framework has support for parsing raw Theora streams, encoding and decoding raw Theora streams to/from YUV video

== Editing ==
Name	Description	Operating Systems Supported		
Name	Description	Unix-like	OS X	Windows
LiVES	Video editing software for Linux. Can edit, encode and stream theora.	Yes	Yes	?
Kdenlive	The KDE video editor.	Yes	?	?
OpenShot		Yes	?	?
Pitivi	The GNOME video editor.	Yes	?	?
Cinelerra	CVS versions of the Cinelerra non-linear video editing system support Theora, as of August 2005.	Yes	Yes	?
oggz-tools by Xiph.org	Command line programs to examine and edit Ogg files.	Yes	?	Yes
Ogg Video Tools by yornstreamnik	Tools to resize, cut, split, join, and others	Yes	Yes	Yes
AVS Video Editor		?	?	Yes

== Streaming ==
The following streaming media servers are capable of streaming Theora video:

Name	Description	Operating Systems Supported		
Name	Description	Unix-like	OS X	Windows
VLC		Yes	Yes	Yes
Icecast		Yes	?	Yes
LiVES	Can stream ogg/theora/vorbis in realtime to a file or fifo.	Yes	Yes	?

== Makers ==
Elphel is the main maker of cameras that record in theora.

== See also ==
- AV1 (open and royalty-free video coding format)
- Comparison of video codecs
- Dirac (video compression format)
- FFV1 (Lossless intra-frame video coding format)
- Video editing software
