= OpenShot =

Free video editing software

OpenShot Video Editor

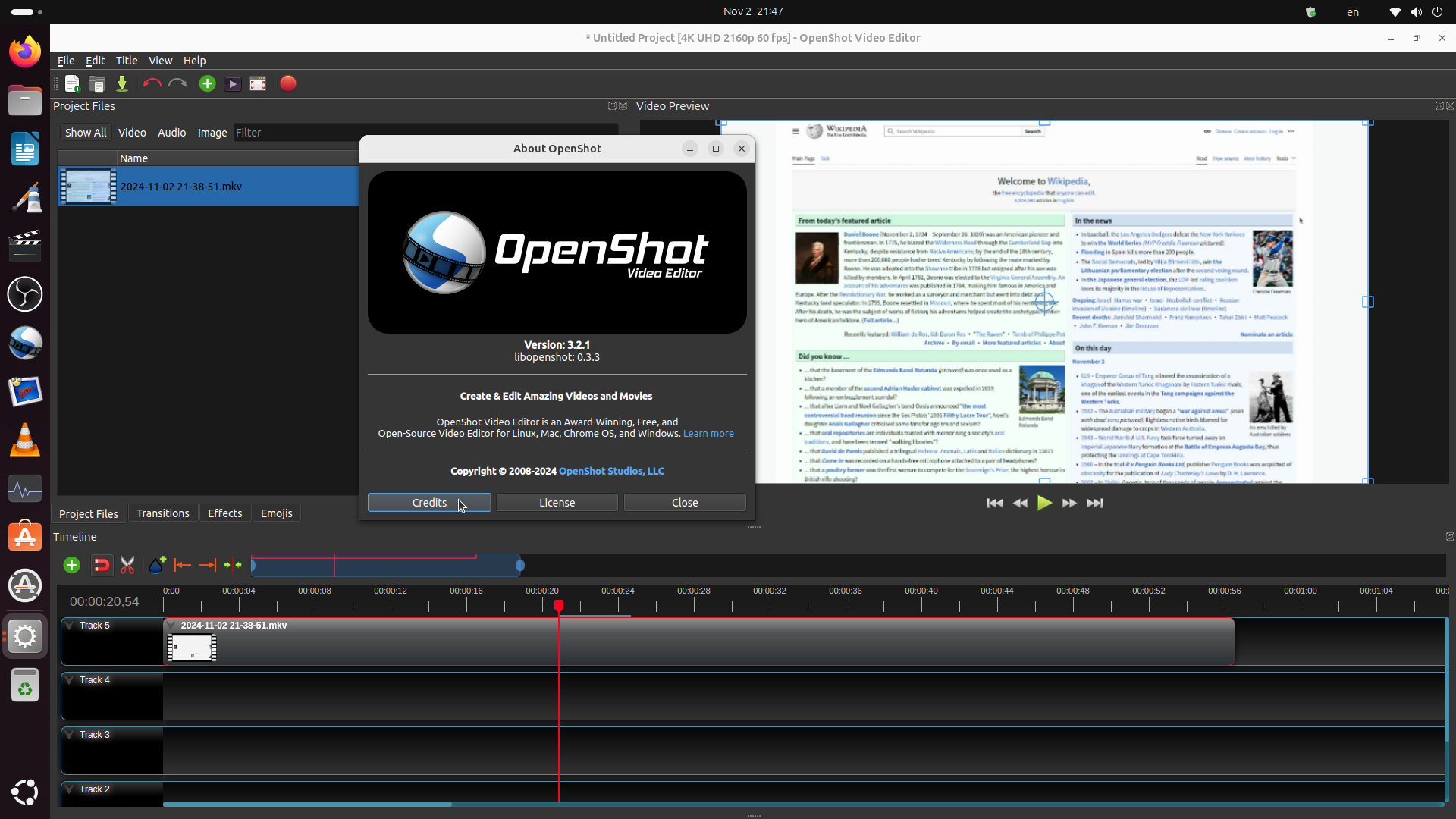
- OpenShot Video Editor Main Window
- Original author: Jonathan Thomas
- Developers: OpenShot Studios, LLC
- Release: August 2008; 18 years ago
- Stable release: 4.0.0 / 31 August 2026
- Written in: Python, PyQt, C++ (libopenshot library)
- Operating system: Windows, macOS, Linux, ChromeOS
- Available in: 172 languages
- Type: Video editing software
- License: GPL-3.0-or-later
- Website: www.openshot.org
- Repository: github.com/OpenShot

OpenShot Video Editor is a free and open-source video editor for Windows, macOS, Linux, and ChromeOS. The project started in August 2008 by Jonathan Thomas, with the objective of providing a stable, free, and friendly to use video editor.

The program supports Windows, macOS, and Linux ever since version 2.1.0 (released in 2016). OpenShot added support for ChromeOS in version 2.6.0 (released in 2021). There is an unofficial portable version beginning in 2020.

OpenShot is written in Python, PyQT, C++ and offers a Python API. OpenShot's core video editing functionality is implemented in a C++ library, libopenshot. The core audio editing is based on the JUCE library.

== History ==
In April 2013, Openshot switched from GTK+ to Qt. In August 2026, Openshot was ported from Qt5 to Qt6.

== Video formats and codecs supported ==
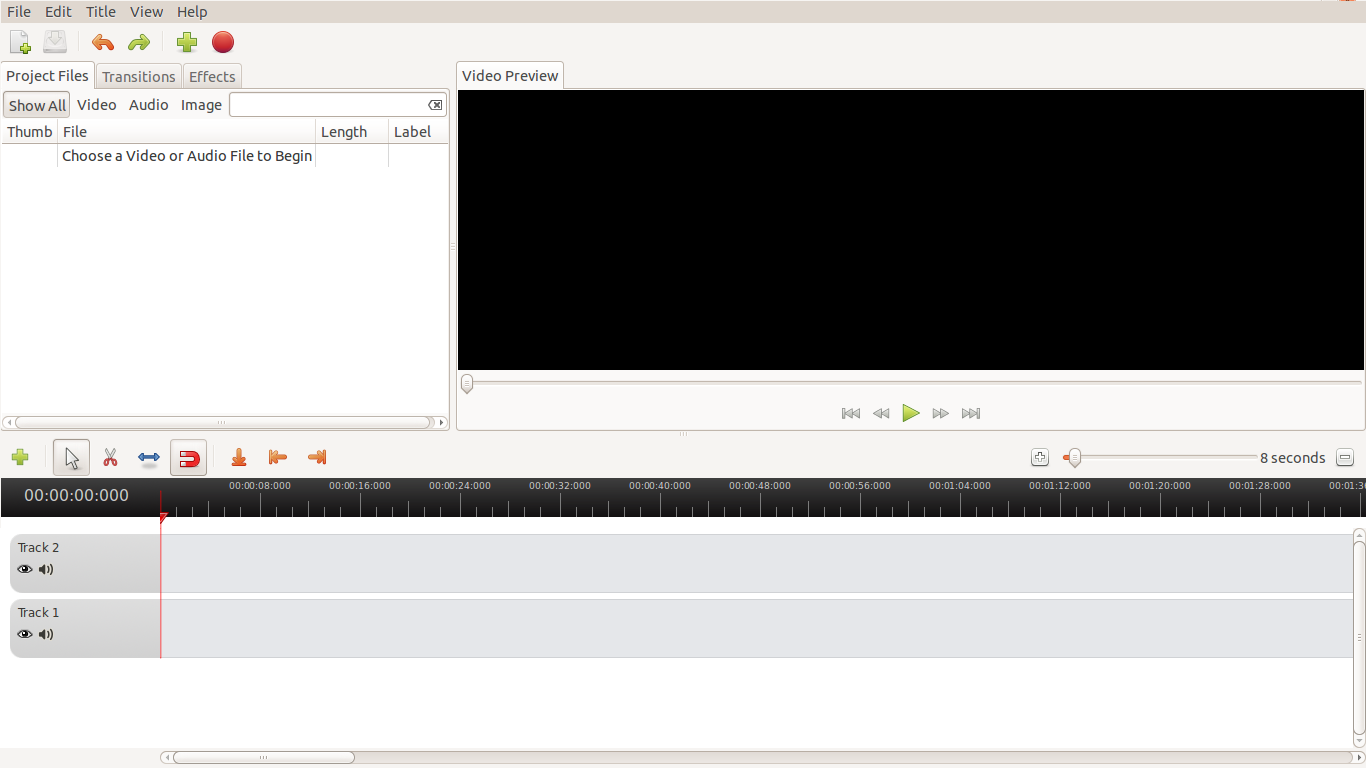
Screenshot of OpenShot Video Editor 1.4.3

OpenShot supports commonly used video compression formats that are supported by FFmpeg, including WebM (VP9), AVCHD (libx264), HEVC (libx265), and audio codecs such as mp3 (libmp3lame) and aac (libfaac). The program can render MPEG4, ogv, Blu-ray and DVD video, Full HD, 4K UHD, 8K UHD, and 16K UHD videos.

== Features ==
- Cross-platform video editing software (Linux, macOS, Windows and ChromeOS).
- Support for many video, audio, and image formats using the FFmpeg library. For a full list of supported formats, see the FFmpeg project.
- Powerful curve-based Key frame animations. The key frames interpolation mode can be quadratic Bézier curves, linear, or constant, which determines how the animated values are calculated.
- Desktop integration (drag and drop support, native file browsers, window borders).
- Unlimited tracks / layers Tracks are used to layer images, videos, and audio in a project. Any transparency will show through the layer below it. Tracks can also be moved up, down, or locked.
- Clip resizing, scaling, trimming, snapping, rotation, cutting, alpha, and adjusting X,Y location.
- Video transitions with real-time previews. The quickness and sharpness of the transitions can also be adjusted using keyframes (if needed). Overlapping two clips will create a new transition automatically.
- Compositing, image overlays, watermarks When arranging clips in a video project, images on the higher tracks/layers will be displayed on top, and the lower tracks will be displayed behind them. Much like a stack of paper, items on top cover up items below them. And if you cut any holes out (i.e. transparency) the lower images will show though.
- Title templates, title creation, sub-titles.
- 3D animated titles (and effects) using Blender.
- Advanced Timeline, with features including: Drag & drop, scrolling, alignment, panning, zooming, slicing, preset animation and settings, etc.
- Frame accuracy (step through each frame of video) with keyboard support.
- Time-mapping and speed changes on clips (slow/fast, forward/backward, etc...).
- Audio mixing and editing features, such as displaying waveforms on the timeline, or even rendering the waveform as part of your video. You can also split the audio from your video clip, and adjust each audio channel individually. (Note: Audio must be recorded independently and added in as a separate track; OpenShot does not have an audio dubbing feature.)
- Digital video effects, including brightness, gamma, hue, greyscale, chroma key (bluescreen / greenscreen).

== Reviews ==
- A 2010 review of version 1.0 found it to be of alpha quality and not suited for productive use by the general public.
- In 2011, TechRadar recognized OpenShot Video Editor as the Best Linux Application of 2011.
- On 31 March 2017, a review by Bryan Lunduke on Network World lauded Openshot 2.3 for "its new transformation tool and title editor—as well as its smooth performance". Lunduke also positively mentioned the Linux distribution-agnostic packaging under usage of AppImage.
- In 2018, ReShift awarded OpenShot a Tech Award in the Video-Editing category. The Tech Awards are a shared initiative of The Netherlands biggest and most influential techmedia: Computer!Totaal, PCM, Zoom.nl, Computer Idee, BesteProduct.nl, Techpanel, Power Unlimited, Insidegamer.nl and Gamer.nl.
- TechRadar's Oct 2020 review gave it 2 out of 5 stars, suggested the program was stable but "some features don’t work making editing frustrating".
- TechRadar's Jul. 2022 review gave it 3 out of 5 stars, stating that "the new tools mostly add useful features" and praising the editing interface as being "extremely flexible".

== See also ==
- Comparison of video editing software
- List of video editing software
- Shotcut (open source video editor)
