= OGV =

OGV may stand for:

- Ordinary goods vehicle
- The Theora video compression format (.OGV)
