= LiVES =

Video editing software

- Developer: Gabriel Finch (Salsaman)
- Release: 2002; 24 years ago
- Stable release: 3.2.0 / 8 November 2020
- Written in: C, Perl, Python
- Operating system: Linux, Unix-like
- Available in: 31 languages
- List of languages Arabic, Brazilian Portuguese, Catalan, Simplified Chinese, Croatian, Czech, Danish, Dutch, English, Estonian, Finnish, French, Galician, German, Hebrew, Hungarian, Italian, Japanese, Occitan, Piemontese, Polish, Portuguese, Romanian, Russian, Slovak, Spanish, Telugu, Turkish, Ukrainian, Uyghur, Uzbek.
- Type: Non-linear editing system
- License: GPL-3.0-or-later
- Website: lives-video.com
- Repository: github.com/salsaman/LiVES

LiVES (LiVES Editing System) /ˈlaɪvz/ is a free and open-source video editing software and VJ tool, released under the GNU General Public License version 3 or later. There are binary versions available for most popular Linux distributions (including Debian, Ubuntu, Fedora, Suse, Gentoo, Slackware, Arch Linux, Mandriva and Mageia). There are also ports for BSD, and it will run under Solaris and IRIX. It has been compiled under OS X Leopard, but not thoroughly tested on that platform. In early 2019, a version for Microsoft Windows was announced, with a release slated for in the second half of 2019.

== Development ==
The main developer of LiVES is Gabriel Finch (a.k.a. Salsaman), who is also a video artist and international VJ.

The project began in late 2002, and the 1.0.0 version was released in July 2009.

On the Freecode site, LiVES is listed as the most popular non-linear video editing software.

LiVES was nominated for the category of Best Project for Multimedia in the SourceForge Community Choice Awards 2009.

The LiVES application allows the user to manipulate video in realtime and in non-realtime. The application also has features which go beyond traditional video editing applications - for example, it can be controlled and monitored remotely over a network, and it has facilities for streaming to and from another copy of LiVES. It is resolution and frame rate independent.

LiVES uses a system of plugins for effects, decoders, encoders and video playback. The APIs for these are now well defined, and the application can be easily extended.

Actual Version 3.2 is based on GTK+ 2.16+ or 3.

== Interface ==
LiVES has two main interfaces: the clip editor, which serves as a repository of video and audio material, and the multitrack window, where multiple clips can be positioned on the timeline.

The clip editor allows free playback at variable play rates, applying of multiple realtime effects and mixing of clips. This mode is mainly used by VJs. Video editors can also use this interface to prepare the clips before entering into multitrack mode.

In multitrack mode, the individual clips can be arranged in layers on the timeline. Further effects and transitions can be applied here, and the audio can be mixed down. The entire timeline can then be rendered, creating a new clip.

Rendering previews are shown in real time.

== Features ==
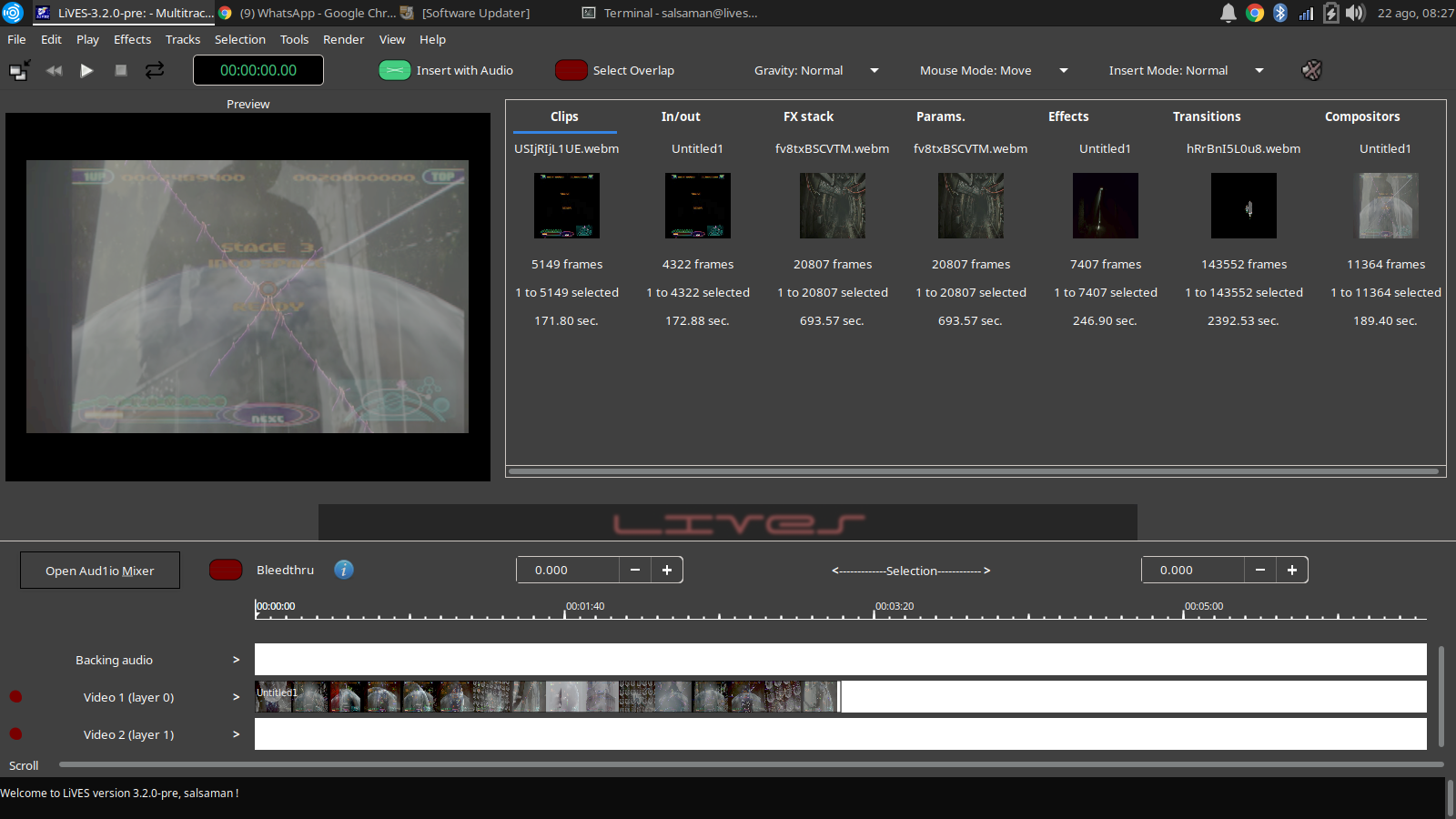
The LiVES Multitrack Window

LiVES' features include:

- Near-instant opening for most audio / video formats via libav.
- Smooth playback at variable frame rates, forward and in reverse. Display frame rate can be controlled independently of playback frame rate.
- Frame accurate cutting and pasting within and between clips.
- Saving/re-encoding of clips, selections, and individual frames.
- Lossless backup/restore.
- Streaming input and output.
- Real time blending of clips (various chroma and luma blends).
- Ability to edit many file types and sources including remotely located files (with mplayer/ffmpeg libraries), and directories of images (rotoscoping).
- Real time capture/recording of interactive (via mouseclicks) external windows.
- Encode to any of the 50+ output formats which are now supported (e.g. mjpeg, mpeg4, mpeg1/2, h264, webm, VCD, SVCD, DVD, x264/Blu-ray, ogg/mp4 ogm, Matroska mkv, dv, swf, Ogg Theora, Dirac, MNG, Snow, xvid, Flash and even animated GIF and PDF)
- Resampling of video (time stretching) to any frame rate (1 to 200 frame/s - accurate to 8 decimal places); option to auto-resample or speed up/slow down between clips.
- Rotation, resizing and trimming of video clips.
- Deinterlacing, subtitle removal. Auto deinterlacing for dv can be enabled.
- Can load mp3, vorbis, mod, it, xm and wav audio files.
- LiVES can also load audio tracks directly off CD to use with video.
- Sample accurate cutting and pasting of audio within and between clips.
- Resampling of audio (rate, channels, sample size, signedness and endianness); audio is auto-resampled between clips.
- Able to record from any external audio source.
- Fade in/fade out feature for clips.
- Audio speed and direction can be smoothly adjusted; both in real time and when rendering.
- Hundreds of effects, including random/targeted zooming, panning of video, colour cycling and colorisation/colour filtering and colour correction.
- LADSPA support for audio effects.
- Merging/compositing of frames is possible: e.g. frame-in-frame, fade in/out and transparency.
- Real time previews when rendered effects are processing.
- Support for the Frei0r 1.1 and 1.2 effect plugin architectures, libvisual plugins, and projectM plugins.
- Multiple real time effects are possible during playback (VJ mode), these can also be rendered to frames.
- Multitrack window with drag and drop and configurable auto-transitions.
- Intelligent screen organisation - shows you only the information which is relevant, no more and no less
- Support for an almost limitless number of tracks and effects
- Non-destructive editing in the multitrack window, with multiple levels of undo/redo.
- Full automation/interpolation of effect parameters.
- Support for stereo backing audio track + stereo audio track per video track
- Automatic gain control for rendering multiple audio channels
- Realtime mixing/previewing of audio
- Channel mixer volume control + fine grained, time variable per-channel volume and pan control.
- Auto-transitioning of audio with video (selectable).
- Full crash recovery.
- Configurable multi-monitor screen placement.
- Simple and intuitive menu layout.
- Drag and drop interface.
- Remote monitoring and control (via Open Sound Control) of the application can be enabled.
- VJ functions can be controlled via keyboard, joystick or MIDI controller.
- I18N text support. Translations into at least French, Czech, German, Japanese, Dutch, Portuguese, Spanish, Italian, Russian, Turkish, Hungarian, Slovak, Simplified Chinese, Finnish, Ukrainian, Arabic, Estonian, Uzbek and Hebrew are included.
- Support for audio output through pulse audio.
- Support for audio output through jack.
- Jack transport support (master or client).
- Support for .srt and .sub subtitle files.
- Vloopback/vloopback2 output for video (Linux only).
- MIDI sequence synchronisation (start/stop).
- Shuttle controls for FireWire cameras/recorders. Can grab from DV and HDV formats.
- Multi-threaded / multi-core for optimised processing.
- Able to download and import clips directly from YouTube, Vimeo and many other video sites.
- Performances can be recorded in real time and then rendered after playback.
- Audio can be switched between internal and external sources with a simple button click.
- Support for custom themes / colour schemes (with import and export abilities).
- Built-in webcam (unicap) support for real time playback, effects and mixing.
- Effect plugins can be linked to provide real time data analysis / processing channels.
- Automatic VJ mode, which can optionally be linked to Mixxx and other DJ software.
- Integration with projectM - generate video in real time from the audio source.
- Can handle in/out streams in LiVES to LiVES or yuv4mpeg format. Streams can be piped from stdout into other applications.
- Support for live FireWire and TV card inputs.
- Internal support for RGB24, RGBA32, YUVA, YUV, YUV422, YUV420 (jpeg and mpeg), YUYV, YUV411, and UYVY palettes; one step conversion with chroma super and subsampling is implemented.
- RFX builder allows rapid prototyping of new effects, transitions, generators, utilities and tools. Custom RFX scripts can be exported to share with others or downloaded and imported. Test scripts are run in a sandbox to allow safe testing of new plugins.

== Gallery ==
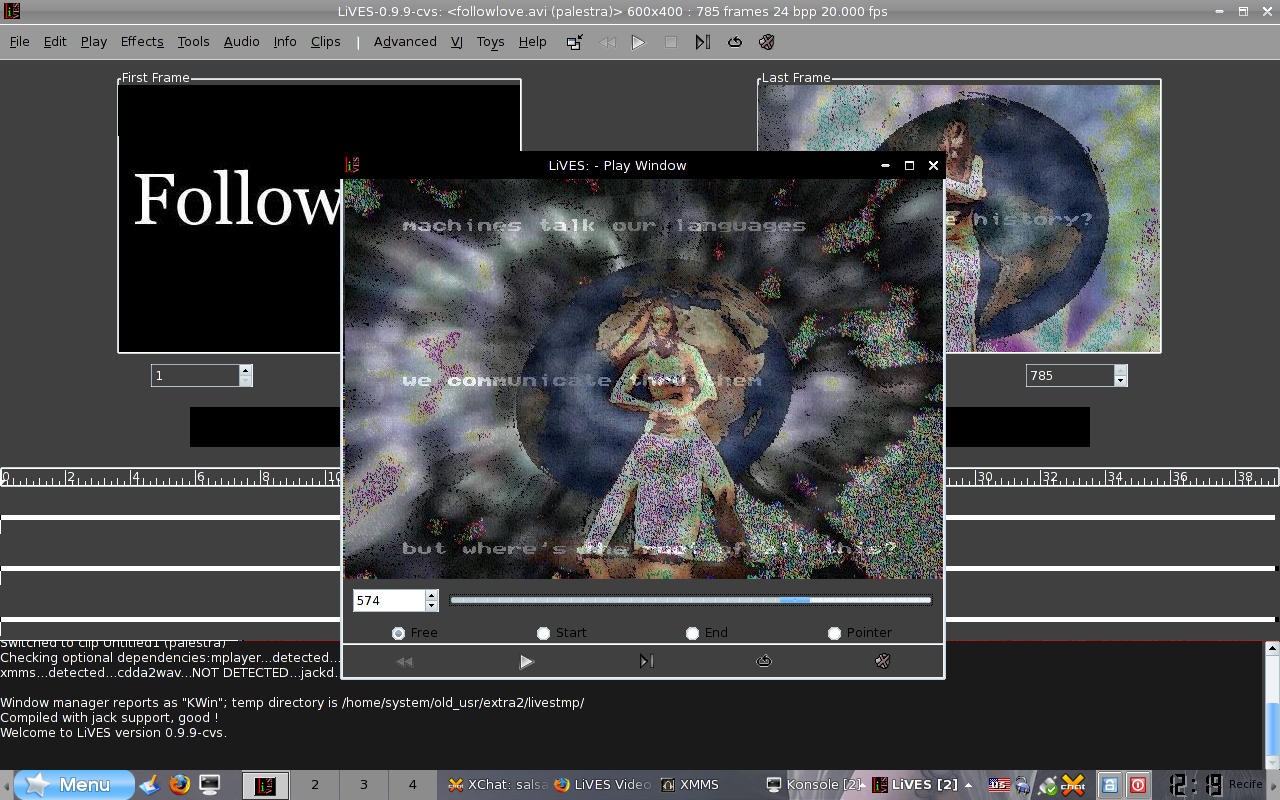
The Clip Editor

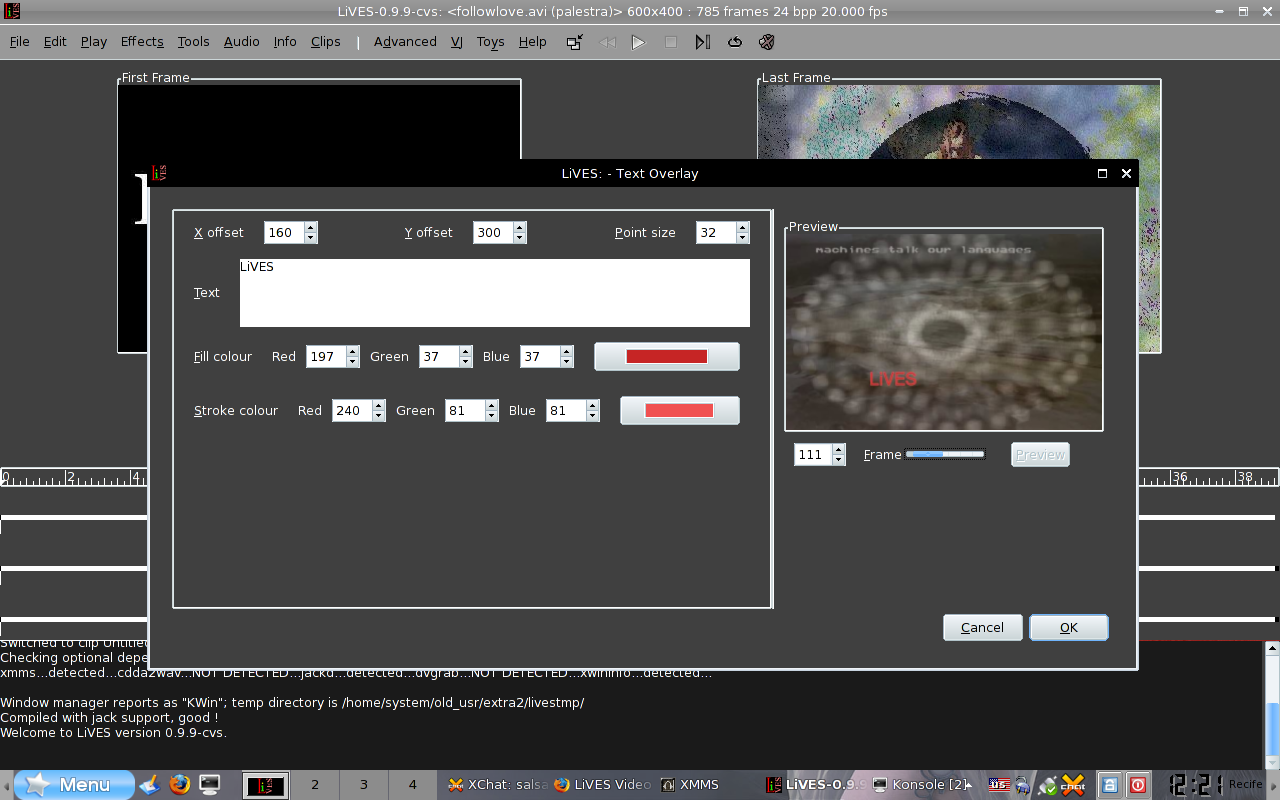
Advanced Rendered Effects

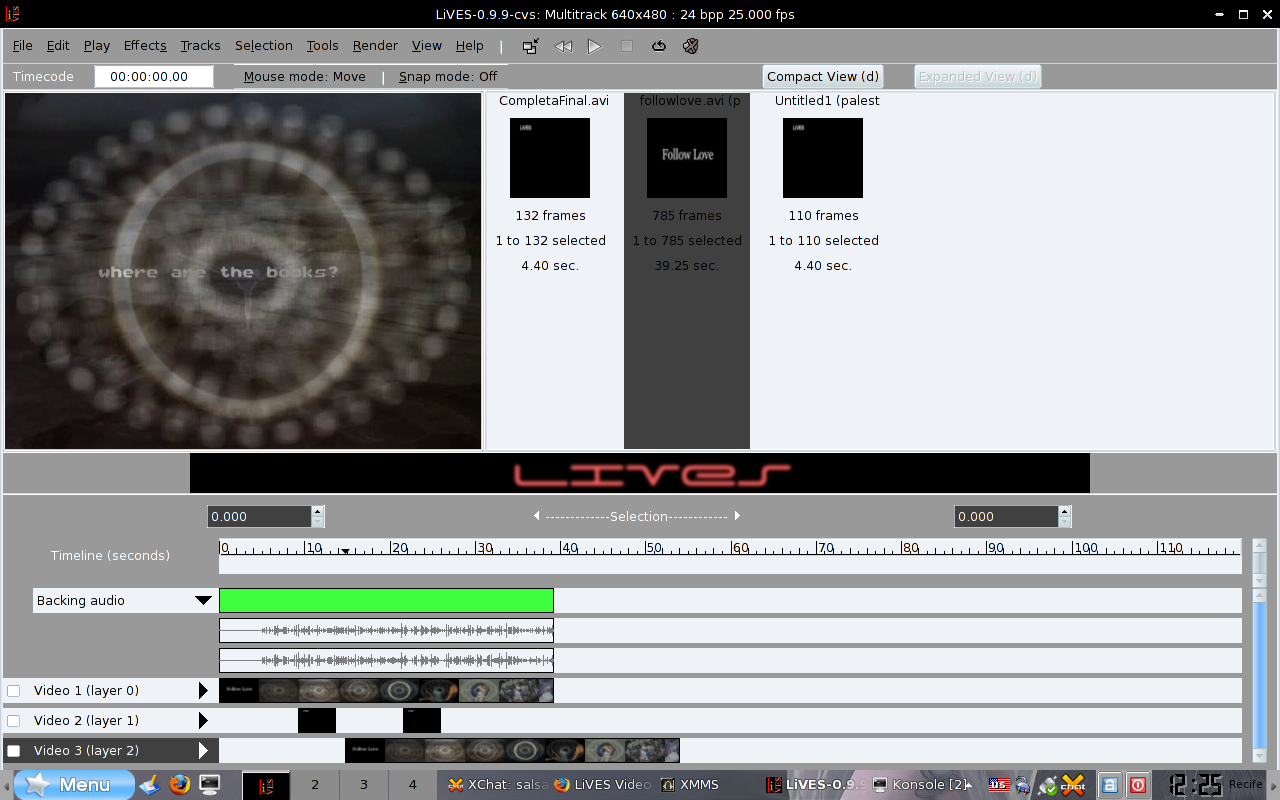
Laying out Tracks in Multitrack

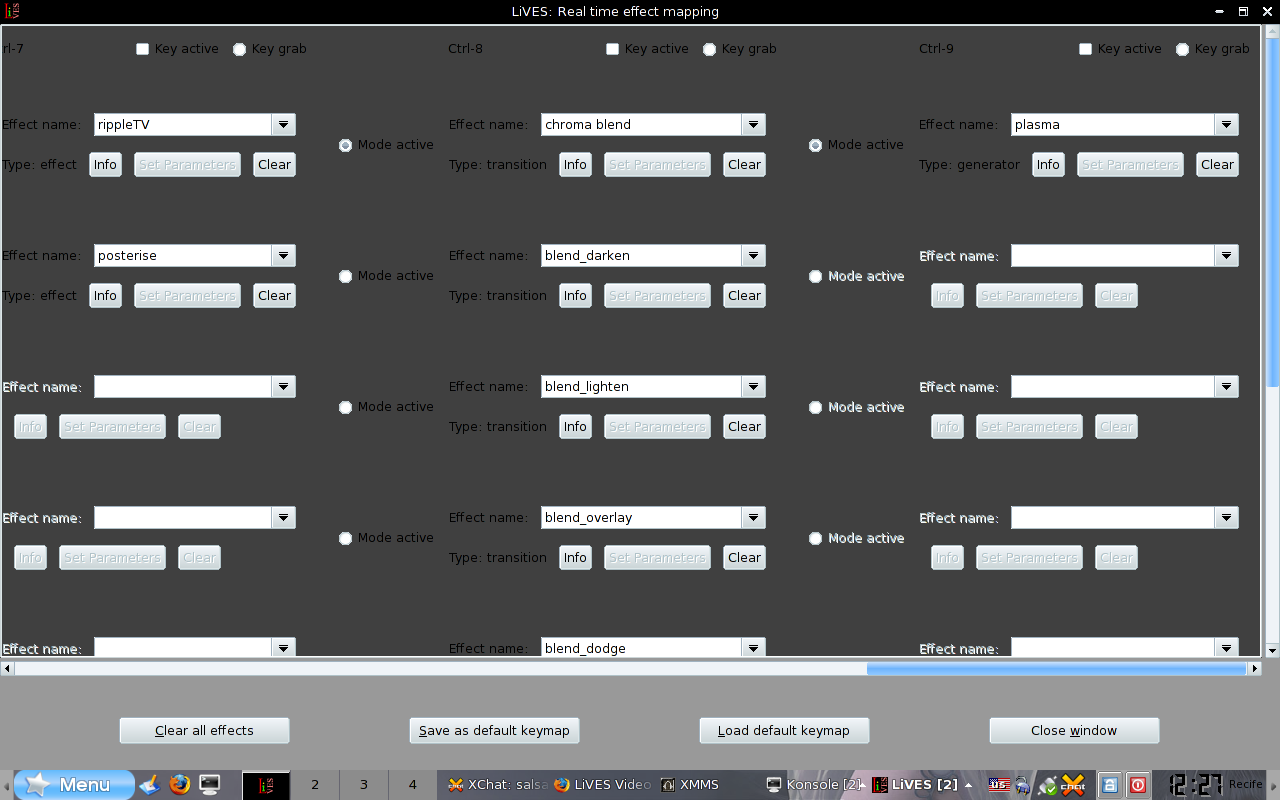
Mapping Realtime Effects to the Keyboard

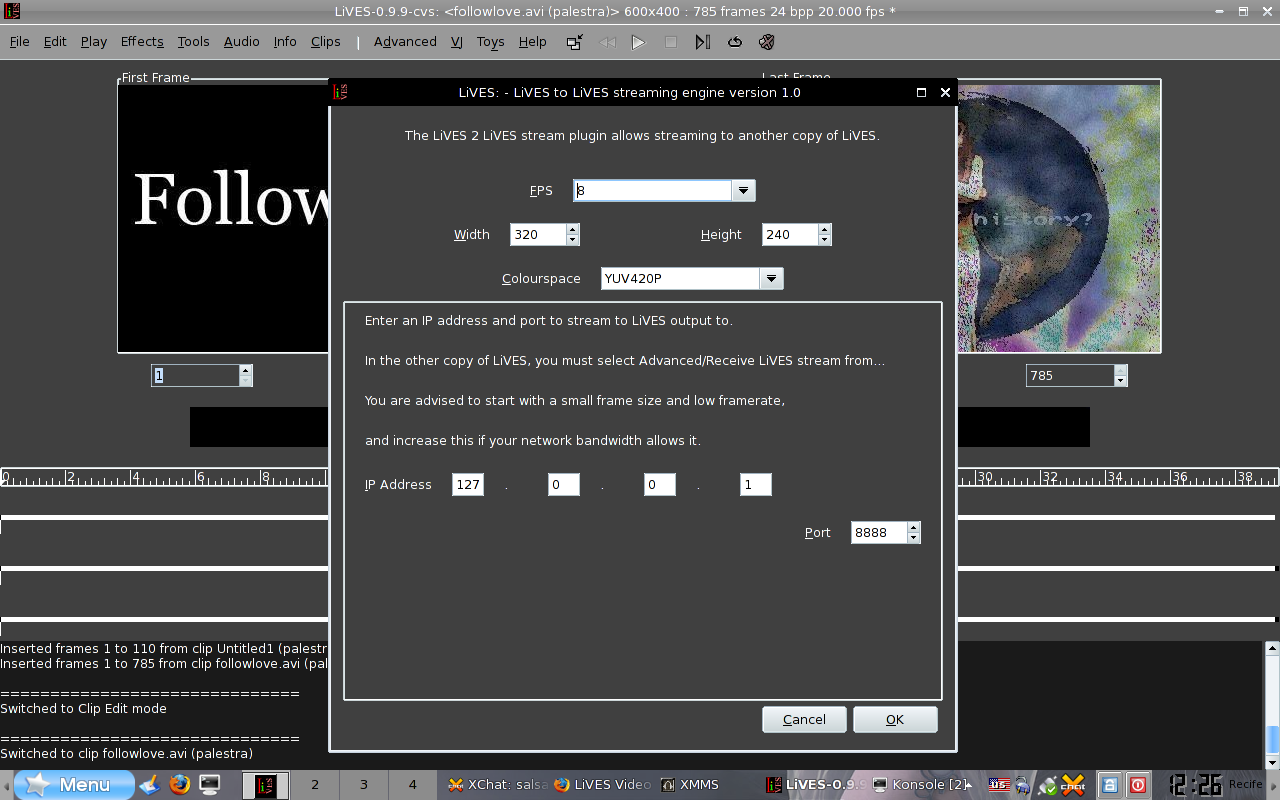
Streaming from LiVES to LiVES

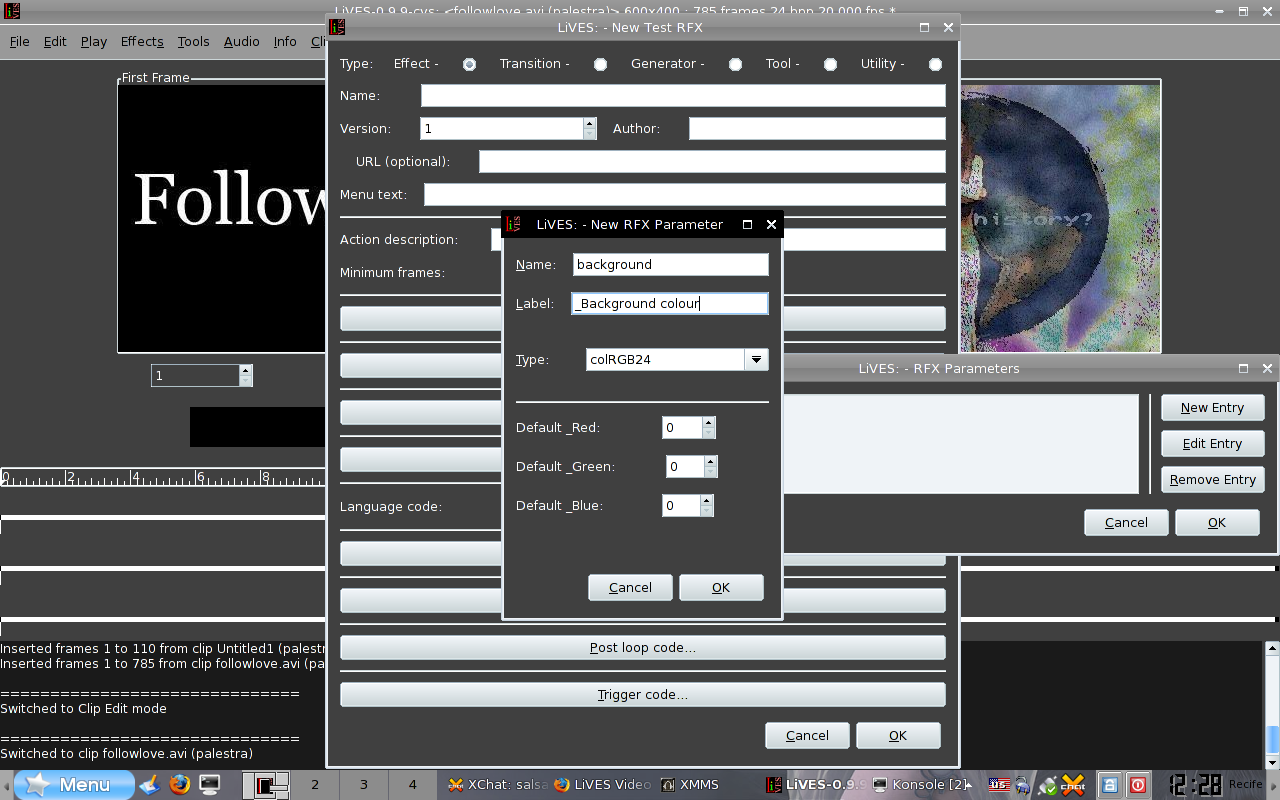
The Plugin Builder Tool

== See also ==
- List of video editing software
- Comparison of video editing software
