= Timewarp (computer graphics) =

A timewarp is a tool for manipulating the temporal dimension in a hierarchically described 3D computer animation system. The term was coined by Jeff Smith and Karen Drewery in 1991. Continuous curves that are normally applied to parametric modeling and rendering attributes are instead applied to the local clock value, which effectively remaps the flow of global time within the context of the subsection of the model to which the curves are applied. The tool was first developed to assist animators in making minor adjustments to subsections of animated scenes that might employ dozens of related interpolation curves. Rather than adjust the timing of every curve within the subsection, a timewarp curve can be applied to the model section in question, adjusting the flow of time itself for that element, with respect to the timing of the other, unaffected elements.

Originally, the tool was used to achieve minor adjustments, moving a motion forward or back in time, or to alter the speed of a movement. Subsequent experiments with the technique moved beyond these simpler timing adjustment and began to employ the timing curves to create more complex effects, such as continuous animation cycles and simulating more natural movements of large collections of models, such as flocks or crowds, by creating numerous identical copies of a single animated model and then applying small random perturbation timewarps to each of the copies, giving the impression of a less robotic precision to the group's movements.

The tool has since become common in both 3D animation and video editing software systems.

== See also ==
- Animation
- Computer animation
