= Librsvg =

SVG rendering library

librsvg
- Original author: Raph Levien
- Developer: GNOME Project
- Stable release: 2.62.3 / 2 June 2026; 2 months ago
- Written in: C, Rust
- Type: Graphics library
- License: GPLv2, LGPLv2
- Website: wiki.gnome.org/Projects/LibRsvg
- Repository: gitlab.gnome.org/GNOME/librsvg

librsvg, (occasionally stylized as LibRsvg) is a free software SVG rendering library written as part of the GNOME project, intended to be lightweight and portable. The Linux command-line program rsvg-convert uses the library to turn SVG files into raster images.

== Backends ==
librsvg uses two other libraries to perform tasks from reading the file to rendering to the screen:

- libxml is used to parse the XML representation of an SVG file into a form that can be accessed quickly by the library.
- cairo is used to render the information obtained by libxml to a block of memory.

Since v2.41.0 many parts have been rewritten in Rust.

== Adoption ==
librsvg is developed for the GNOME desktop environment and as such is used by GNOME Files and GNOME Loupe but is also intended to be used in other software applications. As a notable example, wikis hosted by Wikimedia use librsvg to render SVG images. It was once picked for these web applications because it was decidedly "fast but not very accurate", according to MediaWiki. As of March 2025, Wikipedia and Wikimedia Commons use a version of librsvg 2.54 to render SVG as PNG.

Upon switching to the cairo vector rendering engine in 2005, librsvg became more accurate and more visually pleasing. Since 2012 an independent developer published Win32 console ports rsvg-convert.exe, as of December 2017 version 2.40.20. The rsvg-view manual page is also available online.

=== Version history ===
Version	Date	Comments
1.0.0	2001-05-08	
1.1.6	2002-03-07	
2.0.0	2002-06-19	
2.1.0	2002-09-27	
2.2.0	2003-01-20	
2.3.0	2003-04-08	
2.4.0	2003-09-08	
2.5.0	2003-12-07	
2.6.0	2004-03-08	
2.7.0	2004-03-10	
2.8.0	2004-09-03	
2.9.0	2005-01-25	
2.11.0	2005-08-25	
2.12.0	2005-09-15	
2.13.0	2005-10-21	
2.14.0	2006-02-25	
2.15.0	2006-05-11	
2.16.0	2006-08-31	
2.18.0	2007-07-24	
2.20.0	2008-01-19	
2.22.0	2008-02-21	
2.26.0	2009-03-16	
2.31.0	2010-07-02	
2.32.0	2010-09-27	
2.34.0	2011-04-03	
2.35.0	2011-11-14	
2.36.0	2012-03-26	
2.37.0	2013-01-10	
2.39.0	2013-08-16	
2.40.0	2013-10-14	
2.40.16	2016-06-09	
2.40.17	2017-04-07	
2.40.20	2017-12-16	
2.40.21	2020-02-26	Last version without Rust
2.41.0	2017-01-04	
2.42.0	2018-01-09	
2.43.0	2018-06-12	
2.44.0	2018-08-23	
2.44.10	2018-12-11	
2.45.0	2018-11-17	
2.45.6	2019-05-14	First version only on Rust. Requires Cairo 1.16.0 or later and Rust 1.30.0 or later
2.45.92	2019-09-02	
2.46.0	2019-09-09	
2.47.0	2019-10-29	
2.48.0	2020-03-07	
2.48.9	2020-11-05	
2.49.0	2020-05-29	
2.49.5	2020-09-04	
2.50.0	2020-09-10	
2.50.3	2021-01-28	
2.51.0	2021-02-03	
2.51.4	2021-07-09	
2.52.0	2021-09-15	
2.53.0	2022-01-18	
2.53.1	2022-02-12	
2.53.2	2022-03-12	
2.54.0	2022-03-16	
2.54.7	2022-08-26	As of July 2025, this version is used on Wikimedia Commons.
2.55.0	2022-08-03	
2.55.1	2022-09-05	
2.55.2	2023-03-16	
2.56.0	2023-03-17	
2.57.0	2023-09-13	
2.58.0	2024-03-17	First version to use Rust crates for all image loading operations, eliminating gdk-pixbuf dependency.
2.59.0	2024-09-12	Ditched autotools build system in favour of Meson.
2.59.0	2024-09-12	
2.60.0	2025-03-18	
2.61.0	2025-08-15	
