= FreeJ =

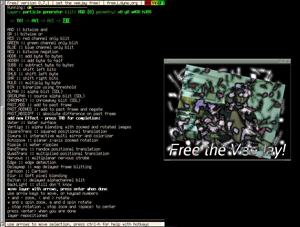
- FreeJ interface
- Original author: Denis Rojo (Jaromil)
- Developers: Denis Rojo (Jaromil); Silvano Galliani (kysucix); Christoph Rudorff
- Release: May 22, 2001
- Stable release: 0.10 / May 30, 2008; 18 years ago
- Preview release: 0.11 / September 8, 2013; 12 years ago
- Written in: C, C++
- Operating system: Linux v0.11 and v0.10; Darwin–macOS v0.10
- Platform: IA-32, x86-64
- Available in: English
- Type: Digital video compositing
- License: GNU General Public License v3+
- Website: freej.dyne.org
- Repository: github.com/diorcety/FreeJ

FreeJ is a modular software vision mixer for Linux systems. It is capable of real-time video manipulation, for amateur and professional uses. It can be used as an instrument in the fields of dance theater, VJing and television. FreeJ supports the input of multiple layers of video footage, which can be filtered through special-effect-chains, and then mixed for output.

== History ==
Denis Rojo (a.k.a. Jaromil) is the original author, and as of 2013 is the current maintainer. Since 0.7 was released, Silvano Galliani (a.k.a. kysucix) joined the core development team, implementing several new enhancements.

== Features ==
FreeJ can be operated in real-time from a command line console (S-Lang), and also remotely operated over the network via a Secure Shell (SSH) connection. The software provides an interface for behavior-scripting (currently accessible through JavaScript). Also, it can be used to render media to multiple screens, remote setups, encoders, and live Internet stream servers.

FreeJ can overlay, mask, transform, and filter multiple layers of footage on the screen. It supports an unlimited number of layers that can be mixed, regardless of the source. It can read input from varied sources: movie files, webcams, TV cards, images, renders and Adobe Flash animations.

FreeJ can produce a stream to an icecast server with the video being mixed and audio grabbed from soundcard. The resulting video is accessible to any computer able to decode media encoded with the theora codec.

The console interface of FreeJ is accessible via SSH and can be run as a background process. The remote interface offers simultaneous access from multiple remote locations.
