= Crossfeed =

Blending of right and left channels in stereo audio recordings

Crossfeed is the process of blending the left and right channels of a stereo audio recording. It is generally used to reduce the extreme channel separation often featured in early stereo recordings (e.g., where instruments are panned entirely on one side or the other), or to make audio played through headphones sound more natural, as when listening to a pair of external speakers.

Crossfeed is claimed to provide relief for a small fraction of listeners who otherwise complain of "fatigue" and headaches when they listen to stereo recordings.

Crossfeed is most commonly found in headphone amplifiers and often can be toggled with a switch. Many audio player programs for computers can perform crossfeed via plug-ins or built-in processing.

== Principle of operation ==
Humans are able to identify the location of a sound source (sound localization) by using differences between the signals reaching the left and right ears (interaural time and level differences) along with other auditory cues (spectral cues, room acoustics, etc).

In stereo speakers, the sound from one speaker reaches both ears, although at different levels, and with a delay between one ear and another, since the speaker is placed away from the center. In headphones, this crossfeed does not occur, so the resulting stereo image is different from what is heard from speakers. A crossfeed signal processor attempts to recreate the stereo image heard from speakers by mixing some signal from the left channel into the right channel, and vice versa.

The intent to produce speaker-like sound in headphones distinguishes crossfeed from the more general concept of stereo width reduction, which involves similar techniques.

== Types of crossfeeds ==
=== Analog ===
An analog crossfeed is usually implemented by mixing the left and right channels together to some extent. Since such crossfeeds do not typically correct the delay between the added information and the original signal, they simply reduce the amount of stereo information available, centering the image in the stereo field.

=== Digital (DSP) ===
A digital, or DSP-type, crossfeed is typically more sophisticated, mixing an amount of signal from one channel to the other, delaying the signal to mimic interaural time differences and applying other characteristics of head-related transfer functions (HRTFs) to mimic the changes between the left and right ears. Some digital crossfeeds include controls for varying the realism of the crossfeed implementation and which HRTF characteristics are used. Examples of DSP crossfeeds are Dolby Headphone and Bauer stereophonic-to-binaural DSP.

== See also ==
- 3D audio effect
