= Kdenlive =

Free and open-source video editing software

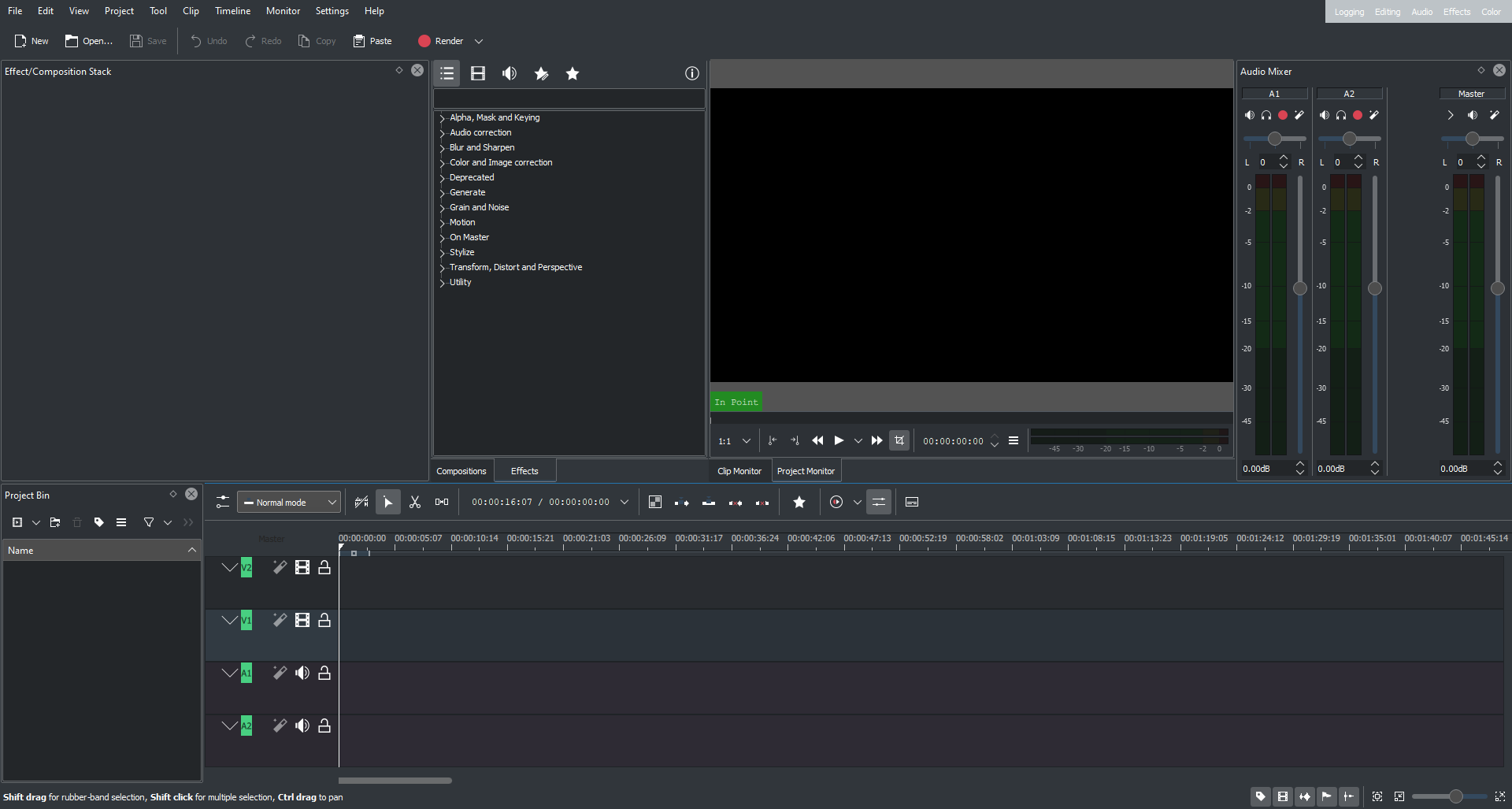
- Kdenlive 24.12
- Developer: KDE (non-profit)
- Stable release: 25.12.2 / 9 February 2026
- Written in: C++ (Qt, KF5)
- Operating system: FreeBSD, Linux, Windows 7 and higher (x64 only), macOS
- Type: Video editing software
- License: GPL-3.0-or-later
- Website: kdenlive.org
- Repository: invent.kde.org/multimedia/kdenlive

Kdenlive (/ˌkeɪdɛnˈlaɪv/; acronym for KDE Non-Linear Video Editor) is a free and open-source video editing software based on the MLT Framework, KDE and Qt.

The project was started by Jason Wood in 2002, and is now part of the official KDE Projects suite. The software is maintained by a team of developers.

Kdenlive can be used for professional video editing due to its advanced features and wide range of formats.

Kdenlive is freely available on FreeBSD, MacOS, Microsoft Windows, and on Linux. The software is distributed under the GNU Public License-3.0, while parts of the source code are available under different licenses such as GPL-2.0-or-later and GPL-3.0-or-later.

== History ==
The project was initially started by Jason Wood in 2002. The development of Kdenlive moved on from the K Desktop Environment 3 version (which wasn't originally made for MLT) to KDE Platform 4, with an almost complete rewrite. This was completed with Kdenlive 0.7, released on 12 November 2008. Kdenlive 0.9.10 released on 1 October 2014 was the last KDE 4 release.

Kdenlive started to plan a move into the KDE Projects and its infrastructure in 2014. Port to KDE Frameworks 5 was finished with the release of 2015.04.0 as part of KDE Applications 5. The move to KDE is ongoing.

In early 2017 the development team started working on a refactoring of the program, and by June 2017 a first preview was available. By December 2017, the refactoring became the main focus of the development team with the release of the first usable preview. Release of the refactoring version was originally planned for August 2018 in the KDE 18.08 Applications release. The refactored version of Kdenlive was released on 22 April 2019 in the KDE 19.04 Applications release.

On 20 September 2022, KDE began the first fundraising drive for Kdenlive, with the funds to be used to implement major features and bring Kdenlive up to the standards of more professional video editors. By 18 October 2022, the initial goal of €15,000 had been met.

During September 2025's Akademy, the annual KDE community conference, it was announced that Kdenlive had been selected by the NLnet organisation's NGI Zero Commons Fund to receive a grant in order to develop a dopesheet feature for the software. The Kdenlive team also gathered for a development sprint, during which numerous user interface and quality of life improvements were planned. In December 2025, Kdenlive's 25.12 version was released, featuring menu restructurings, revamped dockers and audio monitors, as well as bugfixes and a new welcome screen.

== Features ==
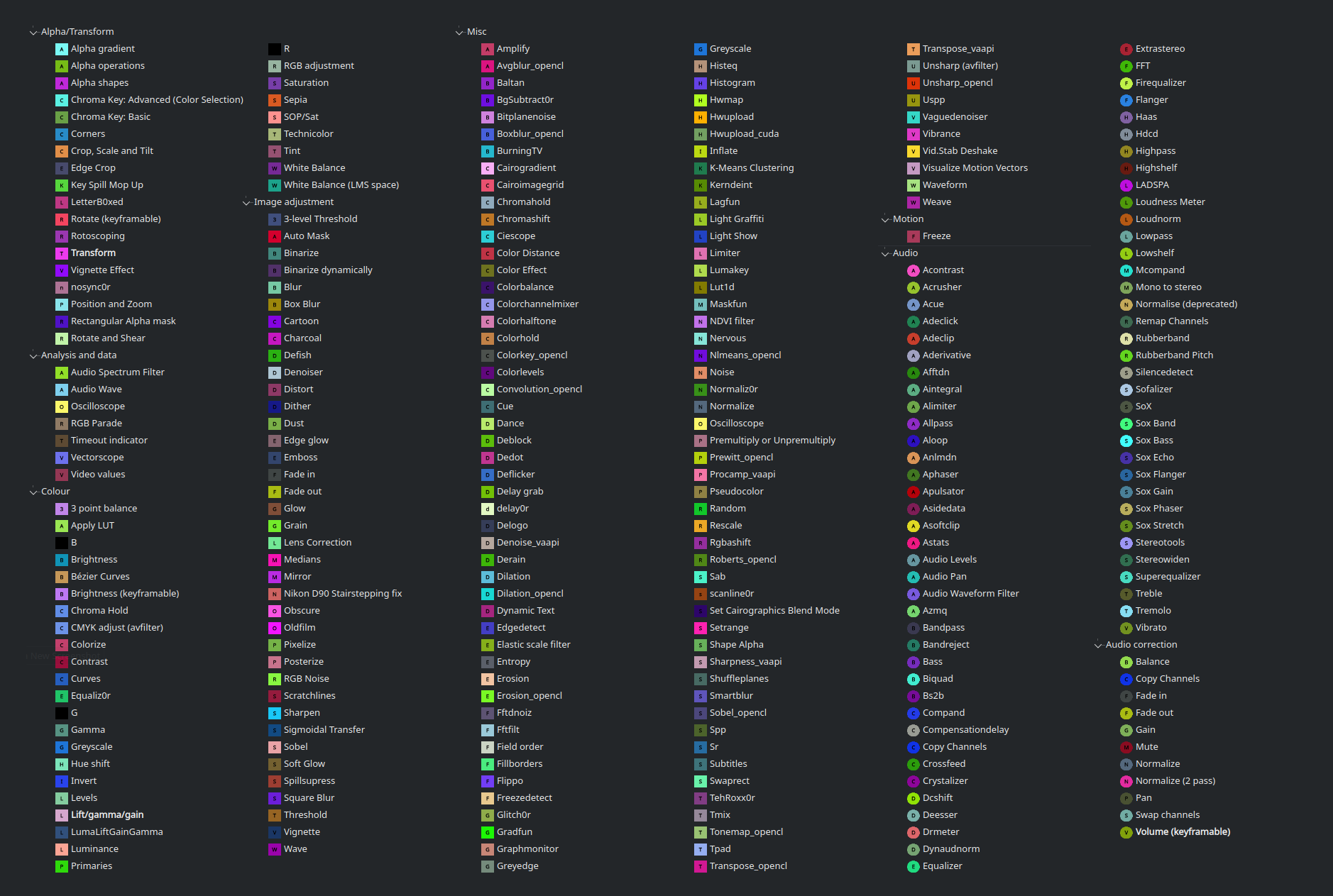
Kdenlive video & audio effects

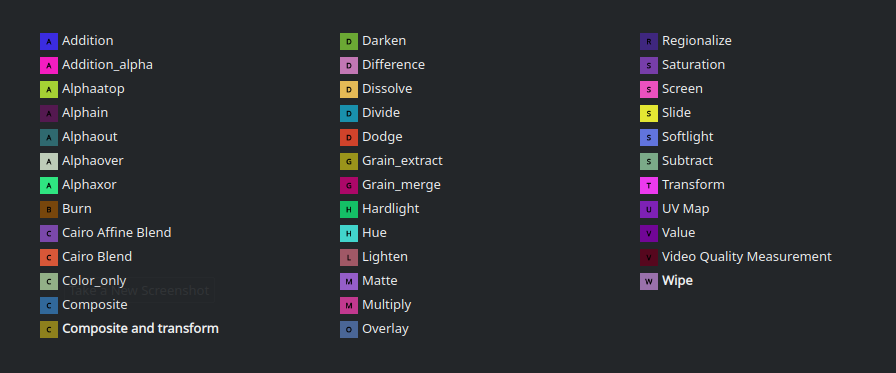
Kdenlive compositions

KDE's Kdenlive makes use of MLT, Frei0r effects, SoX and LADSPA libraries. Kdenlive supports all of the formats supported by FFmpeg or libav (such as QuickTime, AVI, WMV, MPEG, and Flash Video, among others), and also supports 4:3 and 16:9 aspect ratios for both PAL, NTSC and various HD standards, including HDV and AVCHD. Video can also be exported to DV devices, or written to a DVD with chapters and a simple menu.

- Multi-track editing with a timeline and supports an unlimited number of video and audio tracks.
- A built-in title editor and tools to create, move, crop and delete video clips, audio clips, text clips and image clips.
- Ability to add custom effects and transitions.
- A wide range of effects and transitions. Audio signal processing capabilities include normalization, phase and pitch shifting, limiting, volume adjustment, reverb and equalization filters as well as others. Visual effects include options for masking, blue-screen, distortions, rotations, colour tools, blurring, obscuring and others.
- Configurable keyboard shortcuts and interface layouts.
- Rendering is done using a separate non-blocking process so it can be stopped, paused and restarted.
- Kdenlive also provides a script called the Kdenlive Builder Wizard (KBW) that compiles the latest developer version of the software and its main dependencies from source, to allow users to try to test new features and report problems on the bug tracker.
- Project files are stored in XML format.
- An archiving feature allows exporting a project among all assets into a single folder or compressed archive.

== Availability ==
Kdenlive is available on FreeBSD, MacOS, Microsoft Windows, and Linux.

== See also ==
- List of video editing software
- Comparison of video editing software
