= Shotcut =

Video editing software

- Former logo

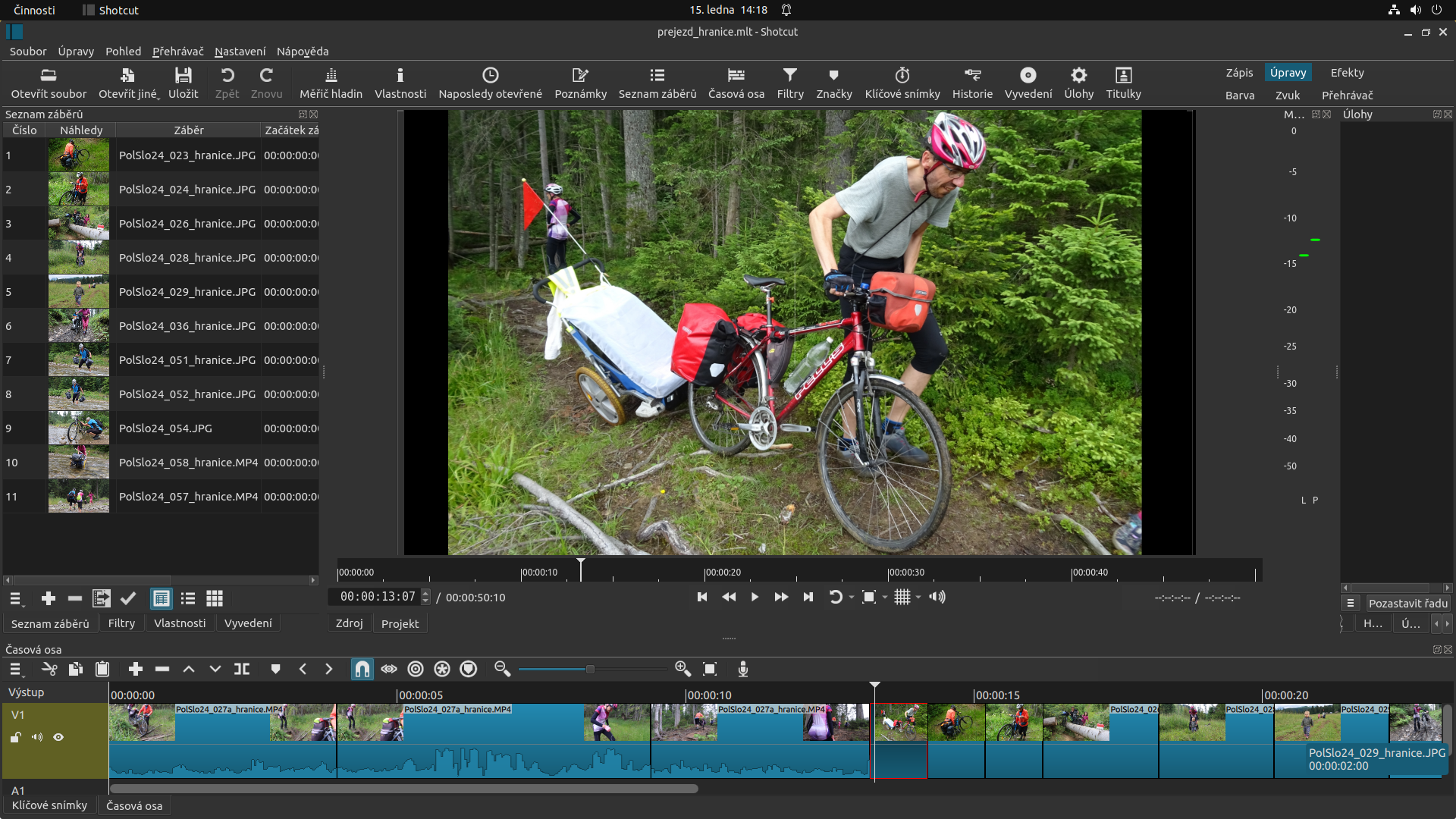
- Original authors: Charlie Yates, Dan Dennedy
- Developers: Meltytech, LLC
- Release: 2004 (original iteration) 2011 (current iteration)
- Stable release: 26.9.27 / 28 September 2026
- Written in: C++ (with Qt)
- Operating system: FreeBSD, Linux, macOS, Microsoft Windows
- Type: Video editing software
- License: GPL-3.0-or-later
- Website: shotcut.org
- Repository: github.com/mltframework/shotcut

Shotcut is a free and open-source, cross-platform video, audio, and image editing program for FreeBSD, Linux, macOS and Windows. Started in 2011 by Dan Dennedy, Shotcut is developed on the MLT Multimedia Framework, in development since 2004 by the same author.

== Features ==
Shotcut supports video, audio, and image formats via FFmpeg. It uses a timeline for non-linear video editing of multiple tracks that may be composed of various file formats. Scrubbing and transport control are assisted by OpenGL GPU-based processing and a number of video and audio filters are available. The output options for the 2017 version included Apple ProRes, HDV, DVD, Flash, H.264, GIF animation, Ogg-Vorbis, WebM, and WMV.

- Format support through FFmpeg
  - Frame-accurate seeking for many formats
- Webcam and audio capture
- Network stream playback (HTTP, HLS, RTMP, RTSP, MMS, UDP)
- EDL (CMX3600 Edit Decision List) export

=== Audio ===
- Audio scopes
  - Loudness
  - Peak meter
  - Waveform
  - Spectrum analyzer
- JACK transport sync

=== Video effects ===
- HTML5 as source and filters
- Color grading tools
- De-interlacing
- Wipe transitions
- Track compositing/blending modes
- Speed and reverse effect for clips
- Keyframes
- Motion Tracking
- Time Remapping
- Rotoscope

=== Hardware ===
- Blackmagic Design SDI and HDMI for input and preview monitoring
- Leap Motion for jog/shuttle control
- Webcam capture
- Audio capture to system audio card
- Capture (record) SDI, HDMI, webcam (V4L2), JACK audio, PulseAudio, IP stream, and Windows DirectShow devices
- Multi-core parallel image processing (when not using GPU and frame-dropping is disabled)
- DeckLink SDI keyer output
- OpenGL GPU-based image processing with 16-bit floating point linear per color component

=== Other ===
- Does not depend on system codecs
- Can run as a portable app from external drive
- Batch encoding with job control
- Stream (encode to IP) files and any capture source
- Video quality measurement (PSNR and SSIM)
- Perform integrity check of an audio/video file
- View detailed information about an audio/video file
- Choice of six different interfaces, like audio effects and video effects

== History ==
Shotcut was originally conceived in November 2004 by Charlie Yates, an MLT co-founder and the original lead developer. The current iteration of Shotcut, introduced in 2011, is a complete rewrite by Dan Dennedy, another MLT co-founder and its current lead. Dennedy wanted to create a new editor based on MLT and chose to reuse the Shotcut name, since he liked it so much. He wanted to make something to exercise the new cross-platform capabilities of MLT, especially in conjunction with the WebVfx and Movit plugins.

== See also ==
- List of video editing software
- List of free video editing software
- Comparison of video editing software
- Non-linear editing system
