= FFmpeg =

Multimedia framework

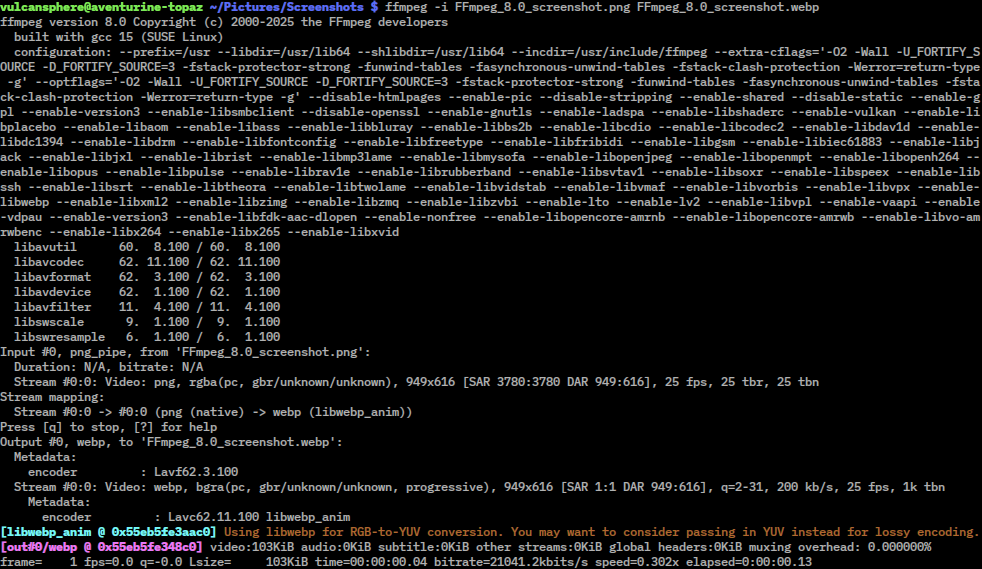
- FFmpeg being used to convert a file from the PNG file format to the WebP format
- Original authors: Fabrice Bellard; Bobby Bingham (libavfilter)
- Developer: FFmpeg team
- Release: December 20, 2000; 25 years ago
- Stable release: 9.0.2 / 18 September 2026
- Written in: C and Assembly
- Operating system: Various, including Windows, macOS, and Linux (executable programs are only available from third parties, as the project only distributes source code)
- Platform: x86, ARM, PowerPC, MIPS, RISC-V, DEC Alpha, Blackfin, AVR32, SH-4, and SPARC; may be compiled for other desktop computers
- Type: Multimedia framework
- License: LGPL-2.1-or-later, GPL-2.0-or-later; Unredistributable if compiled with any software with a license incompatible with the GPL
- Website: ffmpeg.org
- Repository: git.ffmpeg.org/ffmpeg.git

FFmpeg is a free and open-source software project consisting of a suite of libraries and programs for handling video, audio, and other multimedia files and streams. At its core is the command-line ffmpeg tool itself, designed for processing video and audio files. It is widely used for format transcoding, basic editing (trimming and concatenation), video scaling, video post-production effects, and standards compliance (SMPTE, ITU).

FFmpeg also includes other tools: ffplay, a simple media player, and ffprobe, a command-line tool to display media information. Among included libraries are libavcodec, an audio/video codec library used by many commercial and free software products, libavformat (Lavf), an audio/video container mux and demux library, and libavfilter, a library for enhancing and editing filters through a GStreamer-like filtergraph.

FFmpeg is part of the workflow of many other software projects, and its libraries are a core part of software media players such as VLC, and has been included in core processing for YouTube and Bilibili. Encoders and decoders for many audio and video file formats are included, making it highly useful for the transcoding of common and uncommon media files.

FFmpeg is published under the LGPL-2.1-or-later or GPL-2.0-or-later, depending on which options are enabled.

== Project history ==
The project was started by Fabrice Bellard (using the pseudonym "Gérard Lantau") in 2000, and was led by Michael Niedermayer from 2004 until 2015. Some FFmpeg developers were also part of the MPlayer project.

The "FF" in FFmpeg stands for "fast forward." The logo represents a zigzag scan pattern that shows how MPEG video codecs handle entropy encoding.

On March 13, 2011, a group of FFmpeg developers decided to fork the project under the name Libav. The group decided to fork the project due to a disagreement with the leadership of FFmpeg. Libav was declared abandoned in 2020.

On January 10, 2014, two Google employees announced that over 1000 bugs had been fixed in FFmpeg during the previous two years by means of fuzz testing.

In January 2018, the ffserver command-line program – a long-time component of FFmpeg – was removed. The developers had previously deprecated the program citing high maintenance efforts due to its use of internal application programming interfaces.

The project publishes a new release every three months on average. While release versions are available from the website for download, FFmpeg developers recommend that users compile the software from source using the latest build from their source code, using the Git version control system.

== Codec development ==
Two video coding formats with corresponding codecs and one container format have been created within the FFmpeg project so far. The two video codecs are the lossless FFV1, and the lossless and lossy Snow codec. Development of Snow has stalled, while its bit-stream format has not been finalized yet, making it experimental since 2011. The multimedia container format called NUT is no longer being actively developed, but still maintained.

In summer 2010, FFmpeg developers Fiona Glaser, Ronald Bultje, and David Conrad, announced the ffvp8 decoder. Through testing, they determined that ffvp8 was faster than Google's own libvpx decoder. Starting with version 0.6, FFmpeg also supported WebM and VP8.

In October 2013, a native VP9 decoder and OpenHEVC, an open source High Efficiency Video Coding (HEVC) decoder, were added to FFmpeg. In 2016 the native AAC encoder was considered stable, removing support for the two external AAC encoders from VisualOn and FAAC. FFmpeg 3.0 (nicknamed "Einstein") retained build support for the Fraunhofer FDK AAC encoder. Since version 3.4 "Cantor" FFmpeg supported the FITS image format. Since November 2018 in version 4.1 "al-Khwarizmi" AV1 can be muxed in MP4 and Matroska, including WebM.

== Components ==
=== Command-line tools ===
- ffmpeg is a command-line tool that converts audio or video formats. It can also capture and encode in real-time from various hardware and software sources such as a TV capture card.
- ffplay is a simple media player utilizing SDL and the FFmpeg libraries.
- ffprobe is a command-line tool to display media information (text, CSV, XML, JSON), see also MediaInfo.

=== Libraries ===
- libswresample is a library containing audio resampling routines.
- libavcodec is a library containing all of the native FFmpeg audio and video encoders and decoders. Most codecs were developed from scratch to ensure best performance and high code reusability.
- libavformat (Lavf) is a library containing demuxers and muxers for audio/video container formats.
- libavutil is a helper library containing routines common to different parts of FFmpeg. This library includes hash functions, ciphers, LZO decompressor and Base64 encoder/decoder.
- libswscale is a library containing video image scaling, colorspace and pixelformat conversion routines.
- libavfilter is the substitute for vhook which allows the video/audio to be modified or examined (for debugging) between the decoder and the encoder. Filters have been ported from many projects including MPlayer and avisynth.
- libavdevice is a library containing audio/video input and output through internal and external devices.

== Supported hardware ==
=== CPUs ===
FFmpeg encompasses software implementations of video and audio compressing and decompressing algorithms. These can be compiled and run on many different instruction sets, including x86 (IA-32 and x86-64), PPC (PowerPC), ARM, DEC Alpha, SPARC, and MIPS.

=== Special purpose hardware ===
There are a variety of application-specific integrated circuits (ASICs) for audio/video compression and decompression. These ASICs can partially or completely offload the computation from the host CPU. Instead of a complete implementation of an algorithm, only the API is required to use such an ASIC.

Firm	ASIC	purpose	supported by FFmpeg	Details
AMD	UVD	decoding	Yes	via VDPAU API and VAAPI
AMD	VCE	encoding	Yes	via VAAPI
Amlogic	Amlogic Video Engine	decoding	?	
BlackMagic	DeckLink	encoding/decoding	Yes	real-time ingest and playout
Broadcom	Crystal HD	decoding	Yes	
Samsung	Exynos MFC	decoding	Yes	
Qualcomm	Hexagon	encoding/decoding	Yes	hwaccel
Intel	Intel Clear Video	decoding	Yes	(libmfx, VAAPI)
Intel	Intel Quick Sync Video	encoding/decoding	Yes	(libmfx, VAAPI)
Nvidia	PureVideo / NVDEC	decoding	Yes	via the VDPAU API as of FFmpeg v1.2 (deprecated) via CUVID API as of FFmpeg v3.1
Nvidia	NVENC	encoding	Yes	as of FFmpeg v2.6

The following APIs are also supported: DirectX Video Acceleration (DXVA2, Windows), Direct3D 11 (D3D11VA, Windows), Media Foundation (Windows), Vulkan (VKVA), VideoToolbox (iOS, iPadOS, macOS), RockChip MPP, OpenCL, OpenMAX, MMAL (Raspberry Pi), MediaCodec (Android OS), V4L2 (Linux). Depending on the environment, these APIs may lead to specific ASICs, to GPGPU routines, or to SIMD CPU code.

== Supported codecs and formats ==
=== Image formats ===
FFmpeg supports many common and some uncommon image formats.

The PGMYUV image format is a homebrew variant of the binary (P5) PGM Netpbm format. FFmpeg also supports 16-bit depths of the PGM and PPM formats, and the binary (P7) PAM format with or without alpha channel, depth 8 bit or 16 bit for pix_fmts monob, gray, gray16be, rgb24, rgb48be, ya8, rgba, rgb64be.

=== Supported formats ===
In addition to FFV1 and Snow formats, which were created and developed from within FFmpeg, the project also supports the following formats:

Group	Format type	Format name
ISO/IEC/ITU-T	Video	MPEG-1 Part 2, H.261 (Px64), H.262/MPEG-2 Part 2, H.263, MPEG-4 Part 2, H.264/MPEG-4 AVC, HEVC/H.265 (MPEG-H Part 2), MPEG-4 VCB (a.k.a. VP8), Motion JPEG, IEC DV video and CD+G
ISO/IEC/ITU-T	Audio	MP1, MP2, MP3, AAC, HE-AAC, MPEG-4 ALS, G.711 μ-law, G.711 A-law, G.721 (a.k.a. G.726 32k), G.722, G.722.2 (a.k.a. AMR-WB), G.723 (a.k.a. G.726 24k and 40k), G.723.1, G.726, G.729, G.729D, IEC DV audio and Direct Stream Transfer
ISO/IEC/ITU-T	Subtitle	MPEG-4 Timed Text (a.k.a. 3GPP Timed Text)
ISO/IEC/ITU-T	Image	JPEG, Lossless JPEG, JPEG-LS, JPEG 2000, JPEG XL, PNG, CCITT G3 and CCITT G4
Alliance for Open Media	Video	AV1
Alliance for Open Media	Image	AVIF
EIA	Subtitle	EIA-608
CEA	Subtitle	CEA-708
SMPTE	Video	SMPTE 314M (a.k.a. DVCAM and DVCPRO), SMPTE 370M (a.k.a. DVCPRO HD), VC-1 (a.k.a. WMV3), VC-2 (a.k.a. Dirac Pro), VC-3 (a.k.a. AVID DNxHD)
SMPTE	Audio	SMPTE 302M
SMPTE	Image	DPX
ATSC/ETSI/DVB	Audio	Full Rate (GSM 06.10), AC-3 (Dolby Digital), Enhanced AC-3 (Dolby Digital Plus) and DTS Coherent Acoustics (a.k.a. DTS or DCA)
ATSC/ETSI/DVB	Subtitle	DVB Subtitling (ETSI 300 743)
DVD Forum/Dolby	Audio	MLP / Dolby TrueHD
DVD Forum/Dolby	Subtitle	DVD-Video subtitles
Xperi/DTS, Inc/QDesign	Audio	DTS Coherent Acoustics (a.k.a. DTS or DCA), DTS Extended Surround (a.k.a. DTS-ES), DTS 96/24, DTS-HD High Resolution Audio, DTS Express (a.k.a. DTS-HD LBR), DTS-HD Master Audio, QDesign Music Codec 1 and 2
Blu-ray Disc Association	Subtitle	PGS (Presentation Graphics Stream)
3GPP	Audio	AMR-NB, AMR-WB (a.k.a. G.722.2)
3GPP2	Audio	QCELP-8 (a.k.a. SmartRate or IS-96C), QCELP-13 (a.k.a. PureVoice or IS-733) and Enhanced Variable Rate Codec (EVRC. a.k.a. IS-127)
World Wide Web Consortium	Video	Animated GIF
World Wide Web Consortium	Subtitle	WebVTT
World Wide Web Consortium	Image	GIF, and SVG (via librsvg)
IETF	Video	FFV1
IETF	Audio	iLBC (via libilbc), Opus and Comfort noise
International Voice Association	Audio	DSS-SP
SAC	Video	AVS video, AVS2 video (via libdavs2), and AVS3 video (via libuavs3d)
Microsoft	Video	Microsoft RLE, Microsoft Video 1, Cinepak, Microsoft MPEG-4 v1, v2 and v3, Windows Media Video (WMV1, WMV2, WMV3/VC-1), WMV Screen and Mimic codec
Microsoft	Audio	Windows Media Audio (WMA1, WMA2, WMA Pro and WMA Lossless), XMA (XMA1 and XMA2), MSN Siren, MS-GSM and MS-ADPCM
Microsoft	Subtitle	SAMI
Microsoft	Image	Windows Bitmap, WMV Image (WMV9 Image and WMV9 Image v2), DirectDraw Surface, and MSP
Interactive Multimedia Association	Audio	IMA ADPCM
Intel / Digital Video Interactive	Video	RTV 2.1 (Indeo 2), Indeo 3, 4 and 5, and Intel H.263
Intel / Digital Video Interactive	Audio	DVI4 (a.k.a. IMA DVI ADPCM), Intel Music Coder, and Indeo Audio Coder
RealNetworks	Video	RealVideo Fractal Codec (a.k.a. Iterated Systems ClearVideo), 1, 2, 3 and 4
RealNetworks	Audio	RealAudio v1 – v10, and RealAudio Lossless
RealNetworks	Subtitle	RealText
Apple / Spruce Technologies	Video	Cinepak (Apple Compact Video), ProRes, Sorenson 3 Codec, QuickTime Animation (Apple Animation), QuickTime Graphics (Apple Graphics), Apple Video, Apple Intermediate Codec and Pixlet
Apple / Spruce Technologies	Audio	ALAC
Apple / Spruce Technologies	Image	QuickDraw PICT
Apple / Spruce Technologies	Subtitle	Spruce subtitle (STL)
Adobe Flash Player (SWF)	Video	Screen video, Screen video 2, Sorenson Spark and VP6
Adobe Flash Player (SWF)	Audio	Adobe SWF ADPCM and Nellymoser Asao
Adobe / Aldus	Image	TIFF, PSD, and DNG
Xiph.Org	Video	Theora
Xiph.Org	Audio	Speex, Vorbis, Opus and FLAC
Xiph.Org	Subtitle	Ogg Writ
Sony	Audio	Adaptive Transform Acoustic Coding (ATRAC1, ATRAC3, ATRAC3Plus, and ATRAC9) and PSX ADPCM
NTT	Audio	TwinVQ
Google / On2 / GIPS	Video	Duck TrueMotion 1, Duck TrueMotion 2, Duck TrueMotion 2.0 Real Time, VP3, VP4, VP5, VP6, VP7, VP8, VP9 and animated WebP
Google / On2 / GIPS	Audio	DK ADPCM Audio 3/4, On2 AVC and iLBC (via libilbc)
Google / On2 / GIPS	Image	WebP
Epic Games / RAD Game Tools	Video	Smacker video and Bink video
Epic Games / RAD Game Tools	Audio	Bink audio
CRI Middleware	Audio	ADX ADPCM, and HCA
Nintendo / NERD	Video	Mobiclip video
Nintendo / NERD	Audio	GCADPCM (a.k.a. ADPCM THP), FastAudio, and ADPCM IMA MOFLEX
Synaptics / DSP Group	Audio	Truespeech
Electronic Arts / Criterion Games / Black Box Games / Westwood Studios	Video	RenderWare TXD, Madcow, CMV, TGV, TGQ, TQI, Midivid VQ (MVDV), MidiVid 3.0 (MV30), Midivid Archival (MVHA), and Vector Quantized Animation (VQA)
Electronic Arts / Criterion Games / Black Box Games / Westwood Studios	Audio	Electronic Arts ADPCM variants
Netpbm	Image	PBM, PGM, PPM, PNM, PAM, PFM and PHM
MIT/X Consortium/The Open Group	Image	XBM, XPM and xwd
HPE / SGI / Silicon Graphics	Video	Silicon Graphics RLE 8-bit video, Silicon Graphics MVC1/2
HPE / SGI / Silicon Graphics	Image	Silicon Graphics Image
Oracle/Sun Microsystems	Image	Sun Raster
IBM	Video	IBM UltiMotion
Avid Technology / Truevision	Video	Avid 1:1x, Avid Meridien, Avid DNxHD, Avid DNx444, and DNxHR
Avid Technology / Truevision	Image	Targa
Autodesk / Alias	Video	Autodesk Animator Studio Codec and FLIC
Autodesk / Alias	Image	Alias PIX
Activision Blizzard / Activision / Infocom	Audio	ADPCM Zork
Konami / Hudson Soft	Video	HVQM4 Video
Konami / Hudson Soft	Audio	Konami MTAF, and ADPCM IMA HVQM4
Grass Valley / Canopus	Video	HQ, HQA, HQX and Lossless
Vizrt / NewTek	Video	SpeedHQ
Vizrt / NewTek	Image	Vizrt Binary Image
Academy Software Foundation / ILM	Image	OpenEXR
Mozilla Corporation	Video	APNG
Matrox	Video	Matrox Uncompressed SD (M101) / HD (M102)
AMD/ATI	Video	ATI VCR1/VCR2
Asus	Video	ASUS V1/V2 codec
Commodore	Video	CDXL codec
Kodak	Image	Photo CD
Blackmagic Design / Cintel	Image	Cintel RAW
Houghton Mifflin Harcourt / The Learning Company / ZSoft Corporation	Image	PCX
Australian National University	Image	X-Face
Bluetooth Special Interest Group	Audio	SBC, and mSBC
Qualcomm / CSR	Audio	QCELP, aptX, and aptX HD
Open Mobile Alliance / WAP Forum	Image	Wireless Bitmap

=== Muxers ===
Output formats (container formats and other ways of creating output streams) in FFmpeg are called "muxers". FFmpeg supports, among others, the following:

- AIFF
- ASF
- AVI and also input from AviSynth
- BFI
- CAF
- FLV
- GIF
- GXF, General eXchange Format, SMPTE 360M
- HLS, HTTP Live Streaming
- IFF
- ISO base media file format (including QuickTime, 3GP and MP4)
- Matroska (including WebM)
- Maxis XA
- MPEG-DASH
- MPEG program stream
- MPEG transport stream (including AVCHD)
- MXF, Material eXchange Format, SMPTE 377M
- MSN Webcam stream
- NUT
- Ogg
- OMA
- RL2
- Segment, for creating segmented video streams
- Smooth Streaming
- TXD
- WTV

=== Pixel formats ===
Type	Color	Packed		Planar			Palette
Type	Color	Without alpha	With alpha	Without alpha	With alpha	Chroma-interleaved	With alpha
Monochrome	Binary (1-bit monochrome)	monoblack, monowhite	—	—	—	—	—
Monochrome	Grayscale	8/9/10/12/14/16bpp	—	—	16/32bpp	—	—
RGB	RGB 1:2:1 (4-bit color)	4bpp	—	—	—	—	—
RGB	RGB 3:3:2 (8-bit color)	8bpp	—	—	—	—	—
RGB	RGB 5:5:5 (High color)	16bpp	—	—	—	—	—
RGB	RGB 5:6:5 (High color)	16bpp	—	—	—	—	—
RGB	RGB/BGR	24/30 (Note: 10-bit color components with 2-bit padding (X2RGB10))/48bpp	32 (Note: RGBx (rgb0) and xBGR (0bgr) are also supported)/64bpp	—	—	—	8bit->32bpp
RGB	GBR (Note: used in YUV-centric codecs such like H.264)	—	—	8/9/10/12/14/16bpc	8/10/12/16bpc	—	—
RGB Float	RGB	32bpc	16/32bpc	—	—	—	—
RGB Float	GBR	—	—	32bpc	32bpc	—	—
YUV	YVU 4:1:0	—	—	(9bpp (YVU9)) (Note: YVU9, YV12, YV16, and YV24 are supported as rawvideo codec in FFmpeg.)	—	—	—
YUV	YUV 4:1:0	—	—	9bpp	—	—	—
YUV	YUV 4:1:1	8bpc (UYYVYY)	—	8bpc	—	(8bpc (NV11))	—
YUV	YVU 4:2:0	—	—	(8bpc (YV12))	—	8 (NV21)	—
YUV	YUV 4:2:0	—	—	8 (Note: I420 a.k.a. YUV420P)/9/10/12/14/16bpc	8/9/10/16bpc	8 (NV12)/10 (P010)/12 (P012)/16bpc (P016)	—
YUV	YVU 4:2:2	—	—	(8bpc (YV16))	—	(8bpc (NV61))	—
YUV	YUV 4:2:2	8 (YUYV (Note: aka YUY2 in Windows) and UYVY)/10 (Y210)/12bpc (Y212) (Note: UYVY 10bpc without a padding is supported as bitpacked codec in FFmpeg. UYVY 10bpc with 2-bits padding is supported as v210 codec in FFmpeg. 16bpc (Y216) is supported as targa_y216 codec in FFmpeg.)	—	8 (Note: I422 a.k.a. YUV422P)/9/10/12/14/16bpc	8/9/10/12/16bpc	8 (NV16)/10 (NV20 and P210)/16bpc (P216)	—
YUV	YUV 4:4:0	—	—	8/10/12bpc	—	—	—
YUV	YVU 4:4:4	—	—	(8bpc (YV24))	—	8bpc (NV42)	—
YUV	YUV 4:4:4	8 (VUYX)/10 (Note: XV30 a.k.a. XVYU2101010)/12bpc (Note: XV36)	8 (Note: VUYA a.k.a. AYUV) / 16bpc (AYUV64) (Note: 10bpc (Y410), 12bpc (Y412), and Y416 (16bpc) are not supported.)	8 (Note: I444 a.k.a. YUV444P)/9/10/12/14/16bpc	8/9/10/12/16bpc	8 (NV24)/10 (P410)/ 16bpc (P416)	—
XYZ	XYZ 4:4:4 (Note: used in JPEG2000)	12bpc	—	—	—	—	—
Bayer	BGGR/RGGB/GBRG/GRBG	8/16bpp	—	—	—	—	—

FFmpeg does not support IMC1-IMC4, AI44, CYMK, RGBE, Log RGB and other formats. It also does not yet support ARGB 1:5:5:5, 2:10:10:10, or other BMP bitfield formats that are not commonly used.

== Supported protocols ==
=== Open standards ===
- IETF RFCs:
  - FTP
  - Gopher
  - HLS
  - HTTP
  - HTTPS
  - RTP
  - RTSP
  - SCTP
  - SDP
  - SRTP
  - TCP
  - TLS
  - UDP
  - UDP-Lite
- IETF I-Ds:
  - SFTP (via libssh)
- Microsoft OSP:
  - CIFS/SMB (via libsmbclient)
  - MMS over TCP (MS-MMSP)
  - MMS over HTTP (MS-WMSP)
- CENELEC
  - SAT>IP
- OASIS standards:
  - AMQP 0-9-1 (via librabbitmq)
- SRT Alliance standard:
  - SRT (via libsrt)

=== De facto standards ===
- RTSP over TLS
- Icecast protocol
- Adobe RTMP, RTMPT, RTMPE, RTMPTE and RTMPS
- RealMedia RTSP/RDT
- ZeroMQ (via libzmq)
- RIST (librist)

== Supported filters ==
FFmpeg supports, among others, the following filters.

=== Audio ===
- Resampling (aresample)
- Pass or Stop filters
  - Low-pass filter (lowpass)
  - High-pass filter (highpass)
  - All-pass filter (allpass)
  - Butterworth Band-pass filter (bandpass)
  - Butterworth Band-stop filter (bandreject)
- Arbitrary Finite Impulse Response Filter (afir)
- Arbitrary Infinite Impulse Response Filter (aiir)
- Equalizer
  - Peak Equalizer (equalizer)
  - Butterworth or Chebyshev Type I or Type II Multiband Equalizer (anequalizer)
  - Low Shelving filter (bass)
  - High Shelving filter (treble)
  - Xbox 360 equalizer
  - FIR equalizer (firequalizer)
  - Biquad filter (biquad)
- Remove or Add DC offset (dcshift)
- Expression evaluation
  - Time domain expression evaluation (aeval)
  - Frequency domain expression evaluation (afftfilt)
- Dynamics
  - Limiter (alimiter)
  - Compressor (acompressor)
  - Dynamic range expander (crystalizer)
  - Side-chain Compressor (sidechaincompress)
  - Compander (compand)
  - Noise gate (agate)
  - Side-chain Noise gate(sidechaingate)
- Distortion
  - Bitcrusher (acrusher)
- Emphasis (aemphasis)
- Amplify or Normalizer
  - Volume (volume)
  - Dynamic Audio Normalizer (dynaudnorm)
  - EBU R 128 loudness normalizer (loudnorm)
- Modulation
  - Sinusoidal Amplitude Modulation (tremolo)
  - Sinusoidal Phase Modulation (vibrato)
  - Phaser (aphaser)
  - Chorus (chorus)
  - Flanger (flanger)
  - Pulsator (apulsator)
- Echo or Reverb
  - Echo (aecho)
- Routing and Panning
  - Stereo widening (stereowiden)
  - Increase channel differences (extrastereo)
  - M-S to L-R (stereotools)
  - Channel mapping (channelmap)
  - Channel splitting (channelsplit)
  - Channel panning (pan)
  - Channel merging (amerge)
  - Channel joining (join)
  - for Headphones
    - Stereo to Binaural (earwax, ported from SoX)
    - Bauer Stereo to Binaural (bs2b, via libbs2b)
    - Crossfeed (crossfeed)
    - Multi-channel to Binaural (sofalizer, requires libnetcdf)
  - Delay
    - Delay (adelay)
    - Delay by distance (compensationdelay)
- Fade
  - Fader (afade)
  - Crossfader (acrossfade)
- Audio time stretching and pitch scaling
  - Time stretching (atempo)
  - Time-stretching and Pitch-shifting (rubberband, via librubberband)
- Editing
  - Trim (atrim)
  - Silence-padding (apad)
  - Silence remover (silenceremove)
- Show frame and channel information
  - Show frame information (ashowinfo)
  - Show channel information (astats)
  - Show silence ranges (silencedetect)
  - Show audio volumes (volumedetect)
  - ReplayGain scanner (replaygain)
- Modify frame and channel information
  - Set output format (aformat)
  - Set number of sample (asetnsamples)
  - Set sampling rate (asetrate)
- Mixer (amix)
- Synchronization (asyncts)
- HDCD data decoder (hdcd)
- Plugins
  - LADSPA (ladspa)
  - LV2 (lv2)
- Do nothing (anull)

=== Video ===
- Transformations
  - Cropping (crop, cropdetect)
  - Fading (fade)
  - Scaling (scale)
  - Padding (pad)
  - Rotation (rotate)
  - Transposition (transpose)
  - Others:
    - Lens correction (lenscorrection)
    - OpenCV filtering (ocv)
    - Perspective correction (perspective)
- Temporal editing
  - Framerate (fps, framerate)
  - Looping (loop)
  - Trimming (trim)
- Deinterlacing (bwdif, idet, kerndeint, nnedi, yadif, w3fdif)
- Inverse Telecine
- Filtering
  - Blurring (boxblur, gblur, avgblur, sab, smartblur)
  - Convolution filters
    - Convolution (convolution)
    - Edge detection (edgedetect)
    - Sobel Filter (sobel)
    - Prewitt Filter (prewitt)
    - Unsharp masking (unsharp)
- Denoising (atadenoise, bitplanenoise, dctdnoiz, owdenoise, removegrain)
- Logo removal (delogo, removelogo)
- Subtitles (ASS, subtitles)
- Alpha channel editing (alphaextract, alphamerge)
- Keying (chromakey, colorkey, lumakey)
- Frame detection
  - Black frame detection (blackdetect, blackframe)
  - Thumbnail selection (thumbnail)
- Frame Blending (blend, tblend, overlay)
- Video stabilization (vidstabdetect, vidstabtransform)
- Color and Level adjustments
  - Balance and levels (colorbalance, colorlevels)
  - Channel mixing (colorchannelmixer)
  - Color space (colorspace)
  - Parametric adjustments (curves, eq)
- Histograms and visualization
  - CIE Scope (ciescope)
  - Vectorscope (vectorscope)
  - Waveform monitor (waveform)
  - Color histogram (histogram)
- Drawing
- OCR
- Quality measures
  - SSIM (ssim)
  - PSNR (psnr)
- Lookup Tables
  - lut, lutrgb, lutyuv, lut2, lut3d, haldclut

==== Supported test patterns ====
- SMPTE color bars (smptebars and smptehdbars)
- EBU color bars (pal75bars and pal100bars)

==== Supported LUT formats ====
- cineSpace LUT format
- Iridas Cube
- Adobe After Effects 3dl
- DaVinci Resolve dat
- Pandora m3d

== Supported media and interfaces ==
FFmpeg supports the following devices via external libraries.

=== Media ===
- Compact disc (via libcdio; input only)

=== Physical interfaces ===
- IEEE 1394 (a.k.a. FireWire; via libdc1394 and libraw1394; input only)
- IEC 61883 (via libiec61883; input only)
- DeckLink
- Brooktree video capture chip (via bktr driver; input only)

=== Audio IO ===
- Advanced Linux Sound Architecture (ALSA)
- Open Sound System (OSS)
- PulseAudio
- JACK Audio Connection Kit (JACK; input only)
- OpenAL (input only)
- sndio
- Core Audio (for macOS)
  - AVFoundation (input only)
  - AudioToolbox (output only)

=== Video IO ===
- Video4Linux2
- Video for Windows (input only)
- Windows DirectShow
- Android Camera (input only)

=== Screen capture and output ===
- Simple DirectMedia Layer 2 (output only)
- OpenGL (output only)
- Linux framebuffer (fbdev)
- Graphics Device Interface (GDI; input only)
- X Window System (X11; via XCB; input only)
- X video extension (XV; via Xlib; output only)
- Kernel Mode Setting (via libdrm; input only)

=== Others ===
- ASCII art (via libcaca; output only)

== Applications ==
=== Legal aspects ===
FFmpeg contains more than 100 codecs, most of which use compression techniques of one kind or another. Many such compression techniques may be subject to legal claims relating to software patents. Such claims may be enforceable in countries like the United States which have implemented software patents, but are considered unenforceable or void in member countries of the European Union, for example. Patents for many older codecs, including AC3 and all MPEG-1 and MPEG-2 codecs, have expired.

FFmpeg is licensed under the LGPL license, but if a particular build of FFmpeg is linked against any GPL libraries (notably x264), then the entire binary is licensed under the GPL.

=== Projects using FFmpeg ===
FFmpeg is used by software such as Blender, Cinelerra-GG Infinity, HandBrake, Kodi, MPC-HC, Plex, Shotcut, VirtualDub2 (a VirtualDub fork), VLC media player, xine and YouTube. It handles video and audio playback in Chromium (and derivatives such as Google Chrome and Microsoft Edge) and the Linux version of Firefox. GUI front-ends for FFmpeg have been developed, including Multimedia Xpert, XMedia Recode and ShutterEncoder.

FFmpeg is used by ffdshow, FFmpegInterop, the GStreamer FFmpeg plug-in, LAV Filters and OpenMAX IL to expand the encoding and decoding capabilities of their respective multimedia platforms.

As part of NASA's Mars 2020 mission, FFmpeg is used by the Perseverance rover on Mars for image and video compression before footage is sent to Earth.

=== Embedded applications ===
FFmpeg is also being used in embedded applications, where it can be used with custom hardware to simplify version and dependency management and also to provide operating system abstraction across multiple different OS and processor manufacturers.

== See also ==
- MPlayer, a similar project
- List of assembly software and tools
- List of open-source codecs
- List of video editing software
