= Avid Free DV =

- Avid Free DV running on Windows
- Developer: Avid Technology
- Final release: 1.8 (Mac OS X), 1.6 (Windows)
- Operating system: Windows, Mac OS X
- Type: Video editing software
- License: Proprietary
- Website: avid.com/us/resources/freedv

Avid Free DV is a non-linear editing video editing software application developed by Avid Technology. Avid introduced Free DV in January 2003 at the 2003 MacWorld Expo; the company discontinued it in September 2007.

Free DV was intended to give editors a sample of the Avid interface to use in deciding whether or not to purchase Avid software, so when compared with other Avid products its features were relatively minimal. When it was available it was not limited by time or watermarking, so it could be used as a non-linear editor for as long as desired.

== Comparisons ==
When compared with other consumer-end non-linear editors such as iMovie and Windows Movie Maker, it sported more powerful video processing tools, but lacked the ease-of-use and shallow learning curve emphasized in similar programs because it had the full interface of the professional Avid system. However, Avid did offer a number of flash-based tutorials to help new users learn how to use the program for capturing, editing, clipping, processing, and outputting audio/video, among other things.

== Limitations ==
The limitations of Avid Free DV included that it allowed only two video and audio tracks, had fewer editing tools than other Avid products, had few import and export formats, and allowed capture and output of standard-definition DV only, via FireWire. Avid Free DV projects and media were not compatible with other Avid systems.

As the name implied, Avid Free DV was available as a free download, although users were required to complete a short survey on the Avid website before they were given a download link and key.

In addition to using Free DV to evaluate Avid prior to purchase, it could also act as a stepping stone for people wishing to learn to use Avid's other editing products, such as Xpress Pro, Media Composer and Symphony. While additional skills and techniques are necessary to use these professionally geared systems, the basic operation remains the same.

== Operating systems ==
Avid Free DV was available for Windows XP and Mac OS X. The officially supported Mac OS X versions were Panther versions up to 10.3.5, and Tiger versions up to 10.4.3 only.

== Supported formats ==
Avid Free DV supported QuickTime (MOV) and DV AVIs.

== Reception ==
John P. Mello Jr. of The Boston Globe gave Free DV a negative review, finding the user interface obfuscatory and the process of ingesting video error-prone. He summarized: "Professional video editors who use an Avid competitor may jump at the chance to take a free look at how Avid does things. But for the merely curious, this software is a nightmare". Video Systems's Steve Mullen opined that its lack of interoperability with Avid's professional editing software contracted Avid's stated goal to entice budding video editors into buying into the company's software ecosystem.
