= Avid Symphony =

Editing software for the film and television industry

Avid Symphony is non-linear editing software aimed at professionals in the film and television industry. It is available for Microsoft Windows PCs and Apple Macintosh platforms.

Symphony is Avid's high end SD/HD finishing platform for long form work, such as documentary and episodic TV. Its interface is based on the same look and feature set as the Media Composer and Xpress systems, but contains the highest level of features and resolution including secondary color correction, uncompressed HD, and higher real-time performance.

== Release history ==
Symphony is the software component of a tightly integrated package that includes specific hardware audio/video interfaces, storage, and the computer, also sold by Avid. Its release history is therefore tightly related to the release of new Avid interface hardware:

Symphony was introduced to the market in 1998. It was based on Avid's Meridien hardware, supporting SD only, and was available first only for the PC and later for the Macintosh platforms. Its last release was 5.0.5 which supported Windows 2000 and Mac OS X v10.2.
The next major upgrade was Symphony Nitris in 2005, with a redesigned software and integration with the Nitris DNA hardware (PCI-X). It supported 8 bit and 10 bit SD and HD resolutions in both compressed and uncompressed forms, the MXF format and DNxHD codec, and ran only on Windows PC platforms.

Symphony Nitris DX, released in 2008, added support for a range of HD codecs, including HDV, XDCAM-HD, DVCPRO HD, and AVC-I, and brought back Mac OS support for OS X 10.5, as well as Windows Vista.

Since the introduction of Symphony 6, it can be used in software-only mode (where a Nitris or Nitris DX BOB used to be required), and at the same time, like Media Composer, Symphony was opened up with "Open I/O", allowing users to have Symphony use their third party hardware from companies like AJA, Matrox, BlueFish, Blackmagic Design and MOTU.

The last remaining features that differentiate it from Media Composer are Advanced Color Correction (channels, secondary color correction,), Relational Color Correction (corrections based on common clip name, tape name, program track) and Universal HD Mastering (only with Nitris DX hardware). The latter allows cross-conversions of 23.976p or 24p projects sequences to most any other format during Digital Cut.

In 2013, Avid announced it would no longer offer Symphony a standalone product. Starting version 7, Symphony will be sold as an option to Media Composer. This optional package (sold at a premium) will contain all the traditional Symphony-only features to any Media Composer install.

== Use in movies ==
- The Celibacy, Director: Horacio Bocaranda Avid Media Composer 6 and Avid Symphony 6 Nitris DX
- American Hardcore, Director: Paul Rachman Avid Xpress Pro and Symphony
- Summercamp!, Director: Spike Lee Avid Xpress Pro and Symphony
- When the Levees Broke Avid Media Composer and Symphony Nitris
- Superman Returns Edited with Mac-based Film Composer XL, but HD screenings prepped with Symphony

== Related links ==
Avid Technology Inc. - Wikipedia entry on the manufacturer of Avid editing systems
