= Truevision TGA =

Raster graphics file format

- Filename extensions: .tga, .icb, .vda, .vst
- Internet media type: image/x-targa image/x-tga
- Type code: 'TPIC'
- Uniform Type Identifier (UTI): com.truevision.tga-image
- Developed by: Truevision
- Type of format: Raster image file

Truevision TGA, often referred to as TARGA, is a raster graphics file format created by Truevision (now part of Avid Technology). It was the native format of TARGA and VISTA boards, which were the first graphic cards for IBM PC compatibles to support high color or true color display. This family of graphic cards was intended for professional computer image synthesis; the usual resolutions of TGA image files match those of the NTSC and PAL video formats.

TARGA is an acronym for Truevision Advanced Raster Graphics Adapter; TGA is an initialism for Truevision Graphics Adapter.

TGA files commonly have the extension ".tga" on MS-DOS, Windows, and macOS (older Macintosh systems use the "TPIC" type code). The format itself permits any pixel bit depth up to 255, of which up to 15 bits can be dedicated to an alpha channel; however, the only bit depths supported in practice were 8, 15, 16, 24, and 32, where the 16- and 32-bit formats used 1 and 8 bits respectively for the alpha channel. Color data can be color-mapped, or in direct color or truecolor format. Image data may be stored raw, or optionally, a lossless RLE compression similar to PackBits can be employed. This type of compression performs poorly for typical photographic images, but works acceptably well for simpler images, such as icons, cartoons and line drawings.

== History ==
The TGA file format was originally defined and specified by AT&T EPICenter with feedback from Island Graphics Inc in 1984. AT&T EPICenter was an internal spin-off of AT&T created to market new technologies AT&T had developed for color frame buffers. What later became Truevision was the result of a leveraged employee buyout from AT&T in 1987.

EPICenter's first two cards, the VDA (video display adapter) and ICB (image capture board), used the first incarnations of the TGA file format. The file extensions ".vda" and ".icb" implied information about the board specific data contained.

It was later determined by Alan Wlasuk (then head of EPICenter), Brad Pillow (EPICenter) and Steven Dompier (Island's president) that a more codified file format was needed. The file format was created and implemented by Brad Pillow (EPICenter) and Bryan Hunt (EPICenter) and was developed in response to this need for a less board specific file format. A very simple extension was made to what was already in use, and contained information on width, height, pixel depth, an associated color map and image origin. A label field (up to 255 characters) was also included in the initial spec, but was rarely used.

At the time, another technically superior file format called TIFF also appeared, but its use for true color images was very limited as the implementation and sharing of files between applications supporting the TIFF specification was rather difficult and involved. The TGA file format's simpler nature and portability between platforms is the main reason for its widespread adoption and its continued success in a wide variety of applications worldwide to this day.

Initially the TGA file format was used in the ICB-PAINT and TARGA-PAINT programs (what later became known as TIPS) and for several projects in online real estate browsing and still-frame video teleconferencing.

The current version (2.0) includes several enhancements such as "postage stamps" (better known as thumbnails), an alpha channel, gamma value, and textual metadata, and was authored by Truevision Inc.'s Shawn Steiner with direction from Kevin Friedly and David Spoelstra in 1989.

At the time of its launching, it represented the state of the art in digital image processing. Even today, though its maximum color depth is not well suited for high-end pre-press, intensive image processing systems, TGA is still used extensively throughout the animation and video industry because its primary intended outputs are standard TV screens, not color printed pages.

Uncompressed 24-bit TGA images are relatively simple compared to several other prominent 24-bit storage formats: A 24-bit TGA contains only an 18-byte header followed by the image data as packed RGB data. In contrast, BMP requires padding rows to 4-byte boundaries, while TIFF and PNG are metadata containers that do not place the image data or attributes at a fixed location within the file.

32-bit TGA images contain an alpha channel, or key signal, and are often used in character generator programs such as Avid Deko.

== Technical details ==
All values are little-endian; field and subfield numbers are per Version 2.0 of the specification.

Version 2.0 added the extension area and footer. The developer area exists to store application-specific information.

=== Header ===
Field no.	Length	Field name	Description
1	1 byte	ID length	Length of the image ID field
2	1 byte	Color map type	Whether a color map is included
3	1 byte	Image type	Compression and color types
4	5 bytes	Color map specification	Describes the color map
5	10 bytes	Image specification	Image dimensions and format

Image ID length (field 1)

0–255 The number of bytes that the image ID field consists of. The image ID field can contain any information, but it is common for it to contain the date and time the image was created or a serial number.

As of version 2.0 of the TGA spec, the date and time the image was created is catered for in the extension area.

Color map type (field 2)

has the value:

- 0 if image file contains no color map
- 1 if present
- 2–127 reserved by Truevision
- 128–255 available for developer use

Image type (field 3)

is enumerated in the lower three bits, with the fourth bit as a flag for RLE. Some possible values are:

- 0 no image data is present
- 1 uncompressed color-mapped image
- 2 uncompressed true-color image
- 3 uncompressed grayscale image
- 9 run-length encoded color-mapped image
- 10 run-length encoded true-color image
- 11 run-length encoded grayscale image
- 32 huffman-delta-run-length encoded color-mapped image
- 33 huffman-delta-run-length-4-pass-quadtree-type process encoded color-mapped image

Image type 1 and 9: Depending on the Pixel Depth value, image data representation is an 8, 15, or 16 bit index into a color map that defines the color of the pixel. Image type 2 and 10: The image data is a direct representation of the pixel color. For a Pixel Depth of 15 and 16 bit, each pixel is stored with 5 bits per color. If the pixel depth is 16 bits, the topmost bit is reserved for transparency. For a pixel depth of 24 bits, each pixel is stored with 8 bits per color. A 32-bit pixel depth defines an additional 8-bit alpha channel. Image type 3 and 11: The image data is a direct representation of grayscale data. The pixel depth is 8 bits for images of this type.

Color map specification (field 4)

has three subfields:

- First entry index (2 bytes): index of first color map entry that is included in the file
- Color map length (2 bytes): number of entries of the color map that are included in the file
- Color map entry size (1 byte): number of bits per color map entry

In case that not the entire color map is actually used by the image, a non-zero first entry index allows to store only a required part of the color map in the file.

Image specification (field 5)

has six subfields:

- X-origin (2 bytes): absolute coordinate of lower-left corner for displays where origin is at the lower left
- Y-origin (2 bytes): as for X-origin
- Image width (2 bytes): width in pixels
- Image height (2 bytes): height in pixels
- Pixel depth (1 byte): bits per pixel
- Image descriptor (1 byte): bits 3–0 give the alpha channel depth, bits 5–4 give pixel ordering, bits 7-6 data storage interleaving

Image descriptor:

- Bit 3-0 give the alpha channel depth
- Bit 4 of the image descriptor byte indicates right-to-left pixel ordering if set.
- Bit 5 indicates an ordering of top-to-bottom. Otherwise, pixels are stored in bottom-to-top, left-to-right order.
- Bit 7-6 of the image descriptor byte indicate the data storage interleaving mode.

Data storage interleaving mode:

- 0 none
- 1 two-way (even/odd) interleaving
- 2 four-way interleaving
- 3 eight-way interleaving/reserved

=== Image and color map data ===
Field no.	Length	Field	Description
6	From image ID length field	Image ID	Optional field containing identifying information
7	From color map specification field	Color map data	Look-up table containing color map data
8	From image specification field	Image data	Stored according to the image descriptor

=== Developer area (optional) ===
Version 1.0 of the TGA specification was very basic, and many developers had a need to store more information, and so opted to add on extra sections to their files, specific to their application only.

In Version 2.0 of the specification, these application-specific enhancements/extras are supported by the developer area. Only the offset and size of the developer area are relevant to the spec, and developers are free to add whatever they want in the area.

If a TGA decoder cannot interpret the information in the developer area, it will generally ignore it, since it is assumed to have been created by a different application. It is recommended that developers build logic into their applications to determine whether the data in the developer area is compatible with the application; one step towards this is to check the software ID in the file footer.

=== Extension area (optional) ===
Field no.	Length	Field	Description
10	2 bytes	Extension size	Size in bytes of the extension area, always 495
11	41 bytes	Author name	Name of the author. If not used, bytes should be set to NULL (\0) or spaces
12	324 bytes	Author comment	A comment, organized as four lines, each consisting of 80 characters plus a NULL
13	12 bytes	Date/time stamp	Date and time at which the image was created
14	41 bytes	Job ID	
15	6 bytes	Job time	Hours, minutes and seconds spent creating the file (for billing, etc.)
16	41 bytes	Software ID	The application that created the file.
17	3 bytes	Software version	
18	4 bytes	Key color	
19	4 bytes	Pixel aspect ratio	
20	4 bytes	Gamma value	
21	4 bytes	Color correction offset	Number of bytes from the beginning of the file to the color correction table if present
22	4 bytes	Postage stamp offset	Number of bytes from the beginning of the file to the postage stamp image if present
23	4 bytes	Scan line offset	Number of bytes from the beginning of the file to the scan lines table if present
24	1 byte	Attributes type	Specifies the alpha channel

=== File footer (optional) ===
If a TGA file contains a footer, it is likely to be a TGA version 2 file. The footer is the final 26 bytes of the file, of which the last 18 are constant.

Field no.	Length	Field	Description
28	4 bytes	Extension offset	Offset in bytes from the beginning of the file
29	4 bytes	Developer area offset	Offset in bytes from the beginning of the file
30	16 bytes	Signature	Contains "TRUEVISION-XFILE"
31	1 byte		Contains "."
32	1 byte		Contains NUL

=== Specification discrepancies ===
The older version of the TGA file format specification taken from the Appendix C of the Truevision Technical Guide states that run-length encoded (RLE) packets may cross scan lines: "For the run length packet, the header is followed by a single color value, which is assumed to be repeated the number of times specified in the header. The packet may cross scan lines (begin on one line and end on the next)".

However, page 24 of the TGA v2.0 specification states the exact opposite: "Run-length Packets should never encode pixels from more than one scan line. Even if the end of one scan line and the beginning of the next contain pixels of the same value, the two should be encoded as separate packets. In other words, Run-length Packets should not wrap from one line to another".

Consequently TGA readers need to be able to handle RLE data packets that cross scan lines since this was part of the original specification. However, when saving (creating) TGA files it will be necessary to limit RLE data packets to scanline boundaries in order to be compliant with the newer v2.0 TGA specification.
