= SMPTE ST 2067 =

Standards document describing audio/visual master elements

SMPTE ST 2067 is a suite of standards published by the Society of Motion Picture and Television Engineers (SMPTE) that defines the digital delivery and storage of professional audio/visual master elements, known as Interoperable Master Format ("IMF"). Applications within the IMF framework provide standardized interchange and archival for versioned and localized media at a large scale.

The 2067 suite was originally published in 2013, including SMPTE ST 2067-2 (Core Constraints) and SMPTE ST 2067-20 (Application #2, now deprecated for Application #2E). Additional standards describe key components such as the playback methodology through Composition Playlist and carriage of media essence in OP1a compliant MXF.

New capabilities and constraints are added through supplemental standards documents under the ST 2067 standard, such as the plug-in for Immersive Audio Bitstream.

ST 2067 has a document series roadmap for expansion of the standard. It is organized by "parts," of which not all designators are in active use at this time.

| ST 2067 Part | Description |
|---|---|
| 2067-0 | Overview and roadmap |
| 2067-1 through -19 | Core specifications |
| 2067-20 through -29 | Application 2 (Studio Profile, JPEG 2000) |
| 2067-30 through -39 | Application 3 (Studio Profile, MPEG-4) |
| 2067-40 through -49 | Application 4 (Cinema Mezzanine) |
| 2067-50 through -59 | Application 5 (ACES) |
| 2067-100 through -119 | Output Profile |
| 2067-200 through -219 | IMF Plugins |

ST 2067 / IMF shares a common framework with Digital Cinema Package, applying specific limitations upon many of the same standards. Variations on codecs (most notably JPEG 2000 and PCM), specified in the various Applications, are designed to handle specific use cases, with Application 2E currently the most common.

== Support ==
ST 2067 is supported in numerous post-production software suites, such as DaVinci Resolve. Open source tools include Netflix's Photon for validation and an IMF demuxer for FFMPEG.

In May 2019, Amazon London hosted an "IMF Plugfest" where SMPTE and HPA IMF User Group participants performed interoperability testing at scale, leading to the 2020 revision of several parts of the standard

For several years, the European Broadcasting Union had a dedicated working group for ST 2067 and IMF to educate members about the technology and methodology. The format is now included as part of their Video Systems groups.

Other industry groups such as the International Broadcasting Convention and the National Association of Broadcasters regularly post articles and hold discussion panels about the ST 2067 IMF standard.

The Academy of Motion Picture Arts and Sciences Digital Preservation Forum notes IMF "has proved to be imperative in the exchange and processing of multiple content versions of finished works for a variety of global distribution channels..." in their synopsis of the format.

== Specifications ==
Several large entertainment and media entities require variations of the IMF format in their mastering and archival file specifications. These specifications sometimes include constraints upon the larger ST 2067 standard to address unique use cases. Studios leveraging IMF include Netflix, Disney, Sony Pictures, Warner Bros, and the BBC, amongst others.

The United States Library of Congress lists IMF as its preferred file-based video archival format in its larger Recommended Formats Statement.
