= Avid DS =

Editing and visual effects software

- Avid DS running on dual displays
- Developer: Avid
- Final release: 11.1.1
- Operating system: Windows 7
- Type: Video editing software
- License: Proprietary

Avid DS (which was called Avid DS Nitris until early 2008) is a high-end offline and finishing system comprising a non-linear editing system and visual effects software. It was developed by Softimage (this company was owned by Microsoft at the time of DS v1.0's launch before being acquired from Microsoft by Avid Technology, Inc. shortly thereafter) in Montreal.

DS was discontinued on September 30, 2013 with support ending on the same date the following year.

== Software ==
DS was called ‘Digital Studio’ in development. It was envisioned to be a complete platform for video/audio work. The first previews of the system were on the SGI platform, but this version was never released. The system was rewritten on Windows NT with different video hardware platforms (Matrox DigiSuite or Play Trinity running on a NetPower system) before the final system was released on Intergraph/StudioZ hardware in January 1998.

After its acquisition by Avid, DS was always positioned as a high end video finishing tool. However, many users found it to be uniquely soup-to-nuts in its capabilities. From version 1.0 of the product, it competed with products like Autodesk Smoke, Quantel and Avid Symphony. The toolset in DS offered video timeline editing, an object-oriented vector-based paint tool, 2D layer compositing, sample based audio and starting with version 3.01 of the product, a 3D environment. Originally, a subset of the Softimage|XSI 3D software was planned to become part of the DS toolset, both were built on the same software foundation, but over time the code bases divided between the applications and the integration never happened.

While the first version of the DS still lacked a few key features (no 3D, poor keying, no real-time effects), it had some significant features compared to the competing products at the time. It offered a large number of built in effects. Avid OMF import was available, positioning Softimage DS as a strong finishing tool for then typical off-line Avid systems. Lastly the integration of the toolset of Softimage DS was beyond what other product offered. A Softimage DS user could quickly go from editing, to paint, to compositing with a few mouse clicks all inside the same interface. Some of the lacking features were quickly resolved, within months of version 1.0 a new chroma keyer was released.

Early versions of the software (up thru 4.0) added additional key features. Development continued with one of the first uncompressed HD editing systems (version 4.01) and an attempt to make the system more friendly to Media Composer editors in version 6. In later versions (v7.5 on beyond) DS was criticized for slow development of compositing tools, mainly lack of a new 3D environment and better tracking tools. Many DS users felt that Avid had not been giving DS the attention that it deserved.

On July 7, 2013, Avid sent out an email marking the end of life of the DS product.

"To Our Avid DS customers, We are writing to inform you that Avid will be realigning our business strategy to focus on a core suite of products to best leverage our developmental and creative resources. As part of this transition, we will be ceasing future development of Avid DS with a final sale date of September 30th, 2013"

== Hardware ==
Up until version 10.5, DS was sold as a turn-key system; the software was not available without purchasing CPU, I/O and storage hardware from Avid. Beginning with 10.5, customers were able to configure their own systems using widely available components, based on recommended system requirements. In turn-key systems, there were many hardware refreshes over time.

StudioZ single stream: Intergraph TDZ-425 with 30 minutes of uncompressed SCSI storage. CPUs at the time were Pentium II/300 MHz.

StudioZ dual stream: Intergraph TDZ-2000 GT1 with one hour of fibre channel storage. CPUs on first systems were Pentium II/400 MHz, but last shipping systems had Pentium III/1 GHz. DS was one of the first applications to show that real-time effects could be processed with just the CPUs of the system, not requiring special video cards with real-time effect hardware.

Equinox: Developed by Avid, it was one of the first uncompressed HD video cards available. Systems were available on CPUs from Pentium III/1 GHz to Pentium 4/2.8 GHz. Storage was typically SCSI, but fibre channel was also supported.

Nitris DNA: Developed by Avid, the Nitris hardware was probably the largest hardware update to the system since it was released. 10-bit HD and SD support was standard. Real-time down and cross convert. This was the only hardware for DS that had on-board effect processing. This allowed a system at the time to play back dual-stream uncompressed HD effects in real-time at 16-bit precision. This was also the first hardware from Avid to support the DNxHD codec. Starting with Pentium 4, Intel Core Xeons were supported. SCSI storage was primarily used.

AJA Video Systems: First available as a 4:4:4 option to be used in conjunction with Nitris hardware. Final-generation DS systems used the AJA Video Systems Kona 3 (Xena 2K) card as the only I/O for the system. The last systems shipped with two Intel Core Xeon 6-core processors. SAS is the recommended storage for these systems.

== History ==
| Released | OS | Version | Notes/Major features |
|---|---|---|---|
| 01/1998 | WinNT 4.0 | 1.0 | Softimage DS release on Intergraph TDZ workstation, Base system comes with 30 minutes of uncompressed storage using the 'StudioZ Burst' hardware. |
| 08/1998 | WinNT 4.0 | 2.0 | New blue/green keyer, Graphics Object View, Archive to videotape. |
| 12/1998 | WinNT 4.0 | 2.1 | Real-time dual stream effects on Intergraph TDZ-2000 GT1 hardware. |
| 12/1999 | WinNT 4.0 | 3.0 | Effect trees, more real-time effects, Morph effect (ElasticReality), Paint enhancements, Improved interface layout |
| 03/2000 | WinNT 4.0 | 3.01 | 3D DVE using Avid Marquee engine. |
| 12/2000 | WinNT 4.0 | 4.0 | Product renamed to Avid DS, Remote Processing, AVX1 plug-in support, EPS import, Surround sound mixing, |
| 08/2001 | Windows 2000 | 4.01 | Avid DS HD released on Equinox hardware, Supports uncompressed 1080i and 1080p formats. |
| 12/2001 | WinNT 4.0 and Windows 2000 | 5.0 | Moveable camera in 3D DVE, 1080p@23.976 support, End of StudioZ hardware support. |
| 08/2002 | Windows 2000 | 6.0 | Media Composer 'like' interface, 720p support, Real-time playback of multiple video streams, AAF/AFE import of Media Composer projects with playback of 1:1 media. |
| 07/2004 | WinXP | 7.0 | Support for Nitris hardware, Symphony based color corrector, RP uses DMS Broker for job queuing, 16-bit and 32-bit color depth FX support. |
| 12/2004 | WinXP | 7.5 | DNxHD, MXF support, Link and playback of compressed media from Media Composer. |
| 07/2006 | WinXP | 7.6 | FluidMotion timewarps, Mix framerates on timeline, Source side effects, Expressions. |
| 04/2007 | WinXP and WinXP x64 | 8.0 | Window 64-bit native version, Dual-link RGB 444 option, Symphony Nitris dual boot option, Render engine optimized for 4 core systems, Improved DMS broker, DS Assist Station. |
| 10/2007 | WinXP and WinXP x64 | 8.4 | Render engine optimized for 8 core systems, DS Assist Station supports AJA Video Systems Xena cards for video output, End of Equinox hardware support. |
| 9/2008 | WinXP x64 | 10.0 | HP xw8600 with AJA Video Systems Xena 2Ke as standard hardware, GPU effects, Stereoscopic containers, Interplay, 720p@23.976, 1080p50 & 1080p59.94 formats, 3D LUTs, 12 Real-time Secondary Color Correctors within the Color Corrector. |
| 11/2008 | WinXP x64 | 10.1 | Performance improvements, Support of new formats ("2K DCI (2048 x 1080) @ 23.98" and "DV100 / P2 1280 x 720 @ 50"). |
| 3/2009 | WinXP x64 | 10.1.1 | Native RED support, Mocha Tracking Station trial. |
| 8/2009 | WinXP x64 | 10.2 | HP Z800 hardware support, AVX2, Double speed capture with supported Sony SRW decks, RED audio support, Graphics card playback of 10-bit 4:4:4 RGB on color-managed displays, Timecode with QuickTime support, 1080p@24HZ (True Progressive) output. |
| 1/2010 | WinXP x64 | 10.3 | Red Rocket support, Conform of MC 'Mix and Match' timelines, OpenFX Plug-in, Improvements to AVX2 plug-in, Support for linking to QuickTime files. |
| 7/2010 | WinXP x64 | 10.3.1 | Stereoscopic enhancements (Global zoom, Convergence, Project setting for stereo output type), Updated RED SDK, OFX Host fixes, End of Avid Nitris (classic) DNA hardware support. |
| 12/2010 | Win7 Pro x64 | 10.5 | Available as software only to use with AJA Video Systems Kona 3 (renamed Xena 2Ke) card, RED Color Science 2, Media Composer v5 conform support with AMA RED enhancements, Support for QuickTime 10-bit and 16-bit color codecs, DPX optimizations, Promotion of AVX1 to AVX2 effects. |
| 5/2011 | Win7 Pro x64 | 10.5.1 | Avid ISIS 5000 3.2 support, NVIDIA Quadro 4000 support for generic Avid DS system, Enhanced conform of AMA QuickTime and R3D files. |
| 10/2011 | Win7 Pro x64 | 10.5.2 | AJA Video Systems Kona 3G Support, RED Epic support. |
| 6/2012 | Win7 Pro x64 | 11.0 | Avid Artist Transport and Avid Color Controller support, Long-GOP media playback, DNxHD 444 RGB, 16 channel audio, Custom canvas sizes, Blending modes in timeline, OpenEXR import. |
| 8/2012 | Win7 Pro x64 | 11.0.1 | Improved Artist Color surface controls, updated AJA Video Systems driver. |
| 8/2013 | Win7 Pro x64 | 11.1 | Improved conform including support for conforming projects from Media Composer v7, DNxHD RGB real time media support, ISIS client 10gb or Dual 1Gb connection support. |
