= Media Composer =

Film and video editing software

- Developer: Avid Technology
- Release: 1989; 37 years ago
- Stable release: 2025.12.1 / April 7, 2026; 6 months ago
- Operating system: Windows 11 64-bit 22H2 or later (Professional and Enterprise); macOS 13.x–26.2
- Type: Video editing software
- License: Proprietary
- Website: Avid Media Composer

Media Composer is a non-linear editing (NLE) software application developed by Avid Technology. First introduced in the late 1980s and widely adopted in the 1990s, it has become a prominent tool in the professional editing landscape, particularly in the film, television, and broadcast industries. Media Composer is used in a variety of production environments, including feature films, television shows, documentaries, and streaming service content.

Its interface, functionality, and workflow are designed to accommodate the complex requirements of professional editing, offering advanced tools for managing large volumes of footage and collaborative post-production work. Due to its widespread use in professional environments, it is often regarded as one of the industry standards for non-linear editing, particularly in Hollywood film production and broadcast television. The software's features and workflow are closely aligned with the needs of high-end post-production, and it continues to be a favored tool among professional editors.

== History ==
Media Composer was first released in 1989 as Avid/1, an offline editing system designed for the Macintosh II. According to Eric Peters, one of the founders of Avid, most prototypes of 'The Avid' were originally built on Apollo workstations. At some point, Avid demonstrated one of their products at SIGGRAPH, a prominent conference on computer graphics and interactive techniques.

Says Peters: "Some Apple people saw that demo at the show and said, 'Nice demo. Wrong platform!' It turned out they were evangelists for the then new Macintosh II (with six slots). When we got back to our office (actually a converted machine shop) after the show, there was a pile of FedEx packages on our doorstep. They were from Apple, and they contained two of their prototype Macintosh II machines (so early they didn't even have cases, just open chassis). Also there were four large multisync monitors. Each computer was loaded with full memory (probably 4 megs at the time), and a full complement of Apple software (pre-Claris). That afternoon, a consultant knocked on our door saying, 'Hi. I'm being paid by Apple to come here and port your applications from Apollo to Macintosh.' He worked for us for several weeks, and actually taught us how to program the Macs".

At the time, Macs were not considered powerful enough for video editing. However, the Avid engineering team managed to achieve a data rate of 1,200 kilobytes per second, which enabled offline video editing on the Macintosh platform.

- In August 1992, Avid introduced the Film Composer, the first non-linear digital editing system capable of capturing and editing natively at 24 frames per second. Steven Cohen was the first editor to use Film Composer on a major motion picture, Lost in Yonkers (1993). The system has since been used by notable editors, including Walter Murch, who used it for The English Patient, the first digitally edited film to win an Academy Award for Best Editing.
- 1994: The Academy of Motion Picture Arts and Sciences awarded Avid Film Composer with a plaque for Science & Technical Achievement. Six persons were recognized in that effort: Bill Warner, Eric Peters, Joe Rice, Patrick O'Connor, Tom Ohanian, and Michael Phillips. For continued development, Avid received an Oscar representing the 1998 Scientific and Technical Award for the concept, design, and engineering of the Avid Film Composer system for motion picture editing. Today, Film Composer is no longer available, since all of its specific film editing features were implemented into Media Composer.
- In July 2009, American Cinema Editors (ACE) announced that the ACE Board of Directors had recognized Avid Media Composer software with the Board's first ACE Technical Excellence Award.
- The December 2020 version added a new media engine called the Universal Media Engine (UME). This was added to replace the existing AMA (Avid Media Access) functionallity. Updates enabling this app to support macOS Catalina eliminated 32-bit QuickTime libraries, the legacy AMA engine relied heavily on those libraries. Likewise, the technology behind UME is more flexible and extensible than AMA, allowing Avid to support codecs and formats faster and with better performance than with AMA.
- In December 2022, as part of a long-awaited request for better interoperability between Avid's own apps, Media Composer 2022.12 was released as the first version to be able to export Pro Tools Sessions. This is not a replacement for AAF export, but an additional export function, allowing for a more seamless export process from Media Composer to Pro Tools.
- As of February 2024, Media Composer's ScriptSync option allows for the creation of automatic transcriptions of audio. This is a significant advancement for documentary and other genres of editorial that base storytelling on captured interviews.
- As of June 2024, Media Composer has received significant improvements in its interoperability with Avid Pro Tools. This makes the workflows between the two much more robust.

== Features ==
=== Key features ===
- Managed Media (dedicated media locations and media types which reduce stream counts and increases performance)
- Animatte
- 3D Warp
- Paint
- Live Matte Key
- Tracker / Stabiliser
- Timewarps with motion estimation (FluidMotion)
- SpectraMatte (high quality chroma keyer)
- Color Correction toolset (with Natural Match)
- Stereoscopic editing abilities (expanded in MC v6)
- Linked Clips (previously referred to as AMA - Avid Media Access): the ability to link to and edit with P2, XDCAM, R3D, QuickTime, AVCHD, and other raw media files directly without capture or consolidating/transcoding.
- Mix and Match - put clips of any frame rate, compression, scan mode or video format on the same timeline
- SmartTools - drag and drop style editing on timeline, can be selectively adjusted to the types of actions that the user wants to use when clicking on timeline.
- RTAS - (RealTime AudioSuite), support for realtime track-based audio plug-ins on the timeline.
- 5.1 and 7.1 Surround Sound audio mixing, compatible with Pro Tools
- Script-Based Editing - The ability to import the same scripts used on film shoots (or transcripts in documentary) with the goal of dragging media colips to the scripts and syncing them up. This gives users the ability to click on a word and be taken directly to that portion of the video where the word is spoken.
- ScriptSync AI - The paid option (free in MC Ultimate) to speed up the syncing process in Script-Based Editing. As of 2024 it also includes the ability to create automatic transcriptions.
- PhraseFind AI - The paid option (free in MC Ultimate) to index all dialog phonetically, allowing text search of spoken words.

=== Color correction ===
Avid Symphony has a strong history with broadcast users because much of its design and implementation came from the scopes, monitoring, and terminology that was familiar to the television industry's online mastering process. It has since grown to include Advanced/Secondary/Relational Color Correction and Universal HD Mastering.

Avid Symphony used to be a separate product from Media Composer, purchased as a standalone system for mastering. Beginning with Media Composer 7, Symphony became integrated within Media Composer as a paid option. In 2014 when Media Composer 8 was launched along with Avid's subscription licensing, the paid option included monthly and annual subscription licenses.

=== Software protection ===
The software used to be protected by means of "blesser" floppy, tied to the Nubus's TrueVista board (meaning that if the board is replaced, a new "blesser" floppy comes with the board), and later with USB dongles. As of version 3.5 the dongle is optional, and existing users may choose to use software activation or keep using their dongles, while new licenses are sold exclusively with software activation. The software ships with installers for both Mac and Windows and can physically be installed on several computers, allowing the user to move the software license between systems or platforms depending on the licensing method.

=== Licensing options ===
There are currently four versions of Media Composer.

Media Composer First is a freeware version that allows users to publish completed works directly to the internet.

Media Composer, Media Composer Ultimate, and Media Composer Enterprise are paid licenses, each one includes access to more features respectively.

== User Interface ==
The Avid Media Composer user interface has seen many changes and upgrades over the years. Early versions focused on creating somewhat of a digital representation of the film editing process. The idea of organizing clips using bins was a familiar concept, so it was easy for editors to migrate from the flatbed editing world into Avid's digital interface. Also familiar was the Source/Record window which was seen in KEM and Steenbeck systems.

Through the 1990s, the interface saw practical upgrades which were made in collaboration between its designers who were also working editors, professional editors working in Hollywood, and at network television studios. The interface design remained decidedly plain and two-dimensional, focused more on clip management in the Timeline Window, than on UI colors and buttons.

Crossing Y2K and into the early 2000s with Media Composer 10, 11 and 12, the user interface saw significant advancements in not only project organization but also skeuomorphic design (making buttons and tools look like real-world items with lighting, shading, and sometimes textures). It gave users incredible power in defining their own preferences in button shapes and shading, color coding, workspace architecture, and other intricate customizations. In May 2003 when Avid Adrenaline introduced HD editing and a resetting of the version numbering back to 1.0, work on improving the user interface continued.

With the release of Media Composer 5, the user interface saw a visual change. After extensive testing, the entire industry began discovering that skeuomorphic designs and other visual elements were causing drains on performance. For Media Composer, it was decided to scale-back the design and chase a "flatter" approach. Users who upgraded to this version were initially upset at the loss of customizability but were indeed satisfied with the noticeable reduction in interface lag. This design lasted through Media Composer and Symphony versions 5.0 through 2018.12.15.

By Media Composer 7, 8 and 2018, there was a consistent outcry from customers asking Avid to upgrade the overall interface. The consistent complaint was that it felt "old".

During 2018, Avid conducted extensive interviews, listening sessions, and ACA meetings with hundreds of users to absorb as much of their opinions as possible. Key outcomes from those sessions included needs for stronger organization abilities for bins (bin containers), tools and other interface elements that could snap-to each other, a "paneled" interface that could mold itself to any screen size or configuration, and a means of toggling between the classic concept of Avid Workspaces in a newer, more accessible way (Workspace Toolbar). Another common complaint of the classic interface was its overall performance, which had laggy timeline behavior in comparison to other nonlinear edit systems (NLEs). While the Media Composer team worked on the new user interface, the engineers and architecture team retooled the underlying code and video engine. In June 2019, Avid released Media Composer 2019.6 including a new user interface.

Users saw consistent upgrades to the user interface throughout 2019, 2020 and 2021. As of late 2021, the majority of Media Composer users were subscription-based, and using the modern user interface.

The March 2023 version included a new template for a User Profile called "Transitioning from Adobe Premiere Pro". This configures Media Composer's existing interface and settings to reconfigure itself in such a way to somewhat resemble what they may be accustomed to seeing in Premiere Pro. The purpose is to help Premiere Pro users to operate smoothly in Media Composer. Since Premiere Pro is also compatible for use on Avid's NEXIS shared storage, this new feature is also being used heavily by facilities that have editors and assistants who use both NLE apps.

The August 2023 version allowed customers who were hesitant to migrate from the comforts of the older 2018 version to finally do so. It included a new "Classic" User Profile, which takes many frequently-used settings from the 2018 interface and applies them to the modernized 2023 version. This way the interface was familiar, yet included all of the bug fixes and improvements made in the years since 2018. It also included new AI updates for the classic ScriptSync and PhraseFind options. The new ScriptSync AI and PhraseFind AI offered auto-transcription capabilities, faster workflows, and much more in-depth language support.

== Hardware ==
=== Hardware history ===
Media Composer as standalone software (with optional hardware) has only been available since June 2006 (version 2.5). Before that, Media Composer was only available as a turnkey system.

==== The 1990s ====
From 1991 until 1998, Media Composer 900, 1000, 4000 and 8000 systems were Macintosh-only, and based on the NuVista videoboard by Truevision. The first-release Avids (US) supported 640x480 30i video, at resolutions and compression identified by the prefix "AVR". Single-field resolutions were AVR 1 through 9s; interlaced (finishing) resolutions were initially AVR 21–23, with the later improvements of AVR 24 through 27, and the later AVR 70 through 77. AVR12 was a two-field interlaced offline resolution. Additionally, Avid marketed the Media Composer 400 and 800 as offline-only editors. These systems exclusively used external fast SCSI drives (interfaced through a SCSI accelerator board) for media storage. Avid media was digitised as OMFI (Open Media Framework Interchange) format.

In the mid-nineties, versions 6 and 7 of Media Composer 900, 1000, 8000 and 9000 were based on the Avid Broadcast Video Board (ABVB), supporting video resolutions up to AVR77. The video image was also improved to 720x480. 3D add-on boards (most notably the Pinnacle Alladin, externally, and the pinnacle genie pro board, internally, through special 100 pin bypass cable ) and 16bit 48K 4-channel and 8-channel audio I/O (Avid/Digidesign 442 and Avid/Digidesign 888) were optional.

The 1998 introduction of the Avid Symphony marked the transition from ABVB to the Meridien hardware, allowing for uncompressed SD editing. This introduction was also the first version of Media Composer XL available for the Windows operating system. Many users were concerned that Avid would abandon the Mac platform, which they eventually did not do. Media Composer XL versions 8 through 12.0.5 (models MC Offline XL, MC 1000 XL, MC 9000XL) were built around Meridien hardware. Compression options were expressed in ratios for the first time in the evolution of the product. Even though the video board had changed, the audio I/O was still handled by the Avid/Digidesign 888 (16bit 48K) hardware. At this time, 16x9 aspect ratios began to be supported.

==== The 2000s ====
Avid Media Composer Meridien was released through November 2003.

In 2003, Avid Mojo and Avid Adrenaline formed the new DNA (Digital Non-linear Accelerator) hardware line. The launch of Avid Media Composer Adrenaline brought along a software version renumbering, as it was labeled Avid Media Composer Adrenaline 1.0. At this time, Avid began using MXF (Material Exchange Format) formatting for media files. Avid products maintain compatibility with OMFI files.

Adrenaline was the first Media Composer system to support 24bit audio. It also meant the end of Film Composer and Media Composer Offline, since the Avid Media Composer Adrenaline featured most of the film options and online resolutions and features. From this point onward, Avid systems have supported media storage using SCSI, PCI-e, SATA, IEEE 1394a & b, Ethernet and fiberoptic interfaces.

In 2006, Media Composer 2.5 was the first version to be offered 'software-only', giving the user the option of purchasing and using the software without the additional cost of the external accelerators. Software-only Avid setups could use third-party breakout boxes, usually interfaced via FireWire, to acquire video from SDI and analog sources.

In 2008, the Mojo DX and Nitris DX were introduced, replacing the Adrenaline. Both are capable of handling uncompressed HD video, with the Nitris DX offering greater processing speed and input/output flexibility.

=== Third-party supported breakout I/O hardware ===
Starting with Media Composer 6, a new Open IO API allowed third-party companies to interface their hardware into Media Composer. AJA Video Systems, Blackmagic Design, Matrox, BlueFish and MOTU are supporting this API. Avid's own DX hardware is still natively interfaced into the application which currently allows some extra features that Open IO is limited in (LTC timecode support for example). It is expected that over time some of these missing APIs will be added.

AJA IO Express: Starting with Media Composer 5.5, introduced support for the AJA IO Express interface. This interface will allow SD/HD input and output via SDI and HDMI. It also has analog video and audio outputs for monitoring. It connects to a computer via PCIe or ExpressCard/34 interface.

Matrox MXO2 Mini: Starting with Media Composer 5, Avid introduced support for the Matrox MXO2 Mini interface, as a breakout box with no additional processing. While this interface does have input connections, only output is supported by Media Composer v5.x, starting with Media Composer v6.x you can capture with this interface. The connections on the unit support analog video/audio and HDMI in both SD and HD formats. The device is connected by a cable to either a PCIe card or ExpressCard/34 interface, so this unit can be used on either desktop or laptop computers.

Avid Media Composer compatible hardware is manufactured by AJA Video Systems, Blackmagic Design, BlueFish, Matrox and MOTU.

=== Discontinued breakout I/O hardware ===
Avid systems used to ship with Avid branded I/O boxes, like Mojo, Adrenaline and Nitris. In recent years, Avid ceased to produce their own hardware, instead collaborating with companies like Blackmagic Design and AJA, releasing customized Avid-branded I/O boxes, like the Artist DNxIO, DNxIQ and DNxIV. As of December 31, 2022, Avid stopped selling Artist DNx series I/O hardware and discontinued the product line. Avid no longer manufacture or sell breakout I/O hardware.

- Avid Adrenaline: Rack mountable interface which includes Composite, S-Video, Component and SDI video, four channels of XLR, four channels of AES, two channels of S/PDIF and eight channels of ADAT audio. This interface also has an expansion slot for the DNxcel card which adds HD-SDI input and output as well as a DVI and HD component outputs. The DNxcel card uses Avid's DNxHD compression which is available in 8-bit color formats up to 220mb as well as a 10-bit color format at 220mb. The DNxcel card also adds real-time SD down-convert and HD cross-convert.
- Avid Mojo: Includes Composite and S-Video with two channels of RCA audio. There is an optional component video cable that can be added to this interface. This interface only supports SD video formats.
- Avid Mojo SDI: Includes Composite, S-Video, Component and SDI video, with four channels RCA, four channels AES and two channels optical S/PDIF audio. This interface only supports SD video formats.
- Avid Mojo DX: A newer version of the Mojo with architecture supporting full 1920x1080 HD resolution in addition to standard definition video. This interface has SDI/HD-SDI inputs and outputs, HDMI outputs and stereo 1/4" TRS audio inputs and outputs.
- Avid Nitris DX: A replacement to the Adrenaline hardware, a successor to the original Avid Nitris (used with Avid DS and Avid Symphony), with architecture offering faster processing and full 1920x1080 HD resolution (without extra cards) in addition to standard definition video. This interface also has a hardware DNxHD codec.
- Artist DNxIP: Break out box manufactured by AJA which allows users to stream and receive HD and 2K video over IP,
- Artist DNxIO: Rack-mountable breakout I/O device manufactured by Blackmagic. It was superseded by the Artist DNxIQ.
- Artist DNxIQ: Avid customised rack-mountable breakout I/O device manufactured by Blackmagic.
- Artist DNxID: A small form factor break out box manufactured by blackmagic which offered various inputs and outputs.
- Artist DNxIV: A small form factor break out box manufactured by AJA which offered various inputs and outputs.

=== Discontinued third-party software ===
Some boxed versions of Media Composer came with the following third party software:

- Avid FX - 2D & 3D compositing and titling software (aka Boris RED)
- Sorenson Squeeze - Compression software to create, Windows Media, QuickTime, MPEG 1/2, MPEG 4 or Flash video (v8 monthly/annual subscription only)
- SonicFire Pro 5 - music creation software (includes 2 CDs of music tracks)
- Avid DVD by Sonic - DVD and Blu-ray authoring software (Windows only; no longer updated as of v8)
- NewBlue Titler Pro - 2D and 3D video title software (v8 perpetual licenses bundled with v1, subscription licenses with v2)
- Boris Continuum Complete - 2D and 3D graphics and effects (v8 monthly/annual subscription only)

== Revisions and features ==
Date	Operating system	Version	Description
1989	Macintosh	Avid/1	First release; Serial #001 ships to Alan Miller @ Rebo Studios in June on a Mac IIx; Jeff Bernstein becomes second editor on the Avid
1992	Macintosh		Avid Film Composer; True 24-frame capture, editing, and playback; Open Media Framework (OMF), introduced in April
Jan 1993	Macintosh		Model 210 (unbundled) ($15,000); Model 220 (with Mac IIci) ($24,900)
Dec 1994	Macintosh	5.2	AVR27; Multicamera editing; Realtime chroma and luma keys; Avid Media Reader support; 3rd party Photoshop plugins support
Jul 1995	Mac OS 7.5	5.5	Film Cutter (simplified version of Film Composer); Hardware-independent QuickTime codec; 3D effects module
Sep 1995	Mac OS 7.5	6.0	Macintosh 68K hardware support dropped; Based on the Avid Broadcast Video Board (ABVB) hardware
Mar 1996	Mac OS 7.5	6.1	PCI-based system
Dec 1996	Mac OS 7.5	6.5	Script-based editing; AVR77; AVR9s
Feb 1998	Mac OS 7.5 - 8	7.0	Models like MC 1000 ($66,500) and MC 8000 ($94,625); Paint; Animatte; AVX plugins; Spot color correction; Image cloning; Intraframe Editing; AudioSuite plugins
1999	Mac OS 7.6 – 8.6	7.2	Last version based on the ABVB hardware.
1999	Mac OS 8.5	8.0	Meridien hardware based; ABVB hardware support dropped; Uncompressed SD video support; Media Composer XL
1999	Windows	9.0	Meridien hardware based
2000	Mac OS 9, Windows	10.0	SD 24p support on Mac
2001	Mac OS 9, Windows	10.5	
2002	Mac OS 9, Windows	11.0	Marquee (Windows only); DV support (option)
Feb 2003	macOS	11.7	MetaSync; Introduction of 23.976 SD editing (11.5 for Windows, and 11.8 for OSX)
May 2003	macOS, Windows	1.0	Based on the Adrenaline hardware
Nov 2003	macOS, Windows	12.0	Last version based on the Meridien hardware
Sept 2004	macOS, Windows	1.5	MXF support; Marquee on Mac
Dec 2004	Windows	2.0	HD support; HD-SDI I/O with DNxcel card option; 10-bit video support; SpectraMatte keyer; AVX2
March 2005	Windows	2.1	P2 support; XDCam support
Dec 2005	Windows	2.2	HDV support
June 2006	macOS, Windows	2.5	No longer hardware based; HD support on Mac; Media Composer soft; Mojo and Mojo SDI support; XDCam HD; Tracker
Sept 2006	macOS, Windows	2.6	Interplay; Safe Color Limiter effect
March 2007	macOS, Windows	2.6.4	DNxHD36; Low-bandwidth HD compression rate for offline editing
May 2007	macOS, Windows	2.7	MacPro (Intel) support; ScriptSync; P2/XDCam writeout
Dec 2007	macOS, Windows	2.8	VC-1/MXF (SMPTE 421M) support; ASC CDL metadata support
June 2008	macOS, Windows	3.0	'DX' hardware support; new render engine (better multi-threading and GPU support); RT timecode generator; SubCap effect; AVC-I codec support
Sept 2008	macOS, Windows	3.05	XDCAM 50mb format; DNA hardware on Mac OS X 10.5.5; RED workflow support
Dec 2008	macOS, Windows	3.1	Video Satellite option for Pro Tools (Windows only)
March 2009	macOS, Windows	3.5	Avid Media Access (AMA) for better file based workflows; FluidStabiliser; Keyframeable color correction; Native XDCAM EX support; Timecode in QuickTime files; basic stereoscopic 3D support; Software Activation; 14-day Downloadable Trial
Sept 2009	macOS, Windows	4.0	Mix and Match frame rates on timeline; Expert Decompose; AVC-I writeout; Macintosh Video Satellite support; 1080p24 (not-PsF) output; HD Ancillary data support on DX hardware; GFCAM 50mb/100mb support; Stereoscopic enchantments; Updated 3rd party software bundle
Nov 2009	macOS, Windows	4.0.4	Mac OS X 10.6.3 Snow Leopard support
June 2010	macOS, Windows	5.0	Windows 7 support; AMA support for RED; QuickTime and Canon cameras; Matrox MXO2 Mini output; SmartTool 'drag & drop' editing; HD-RGB support; AVCHD import; SMPTE 436M support; RTAS audio plug-in support
March 2011	macOS, Windows	5.5.1	AJA Video Systems Io Express hardware support; HDCAM SR Lite native editing; AVC-Intra codec module for Nitris DX; PhraseFind option; Support for EUCON hardware interfaces; SmartTool improvements; ScriptSync dropped from the trial version
August 2011	macOS, Windows	5.5.3	Mac OS X 10.7 Lion support; Last version to support Windows XP
November 2011	macOS, Windows	6.0	Improved UI (more tabs & less modal); Redesigned stereoscopic toolset; Open I/O (supports 3rd party video hardware); 5.1/7.1 audio mixing support with interoperability with Pro Tools; RED EPIC and AVCHD support for AMA; Support for EUCON Artist hardware interface in the color corrector; DNxHD 4:4:4 format; ProRes encoding on OS X; Built-in Marketplace for purchase of stock footage and plug-ins; MetaSync dropped
September 2012	macOS, Windows	6.5	MXF AS-02 support; Remote editing via Interplay Sphere; Audio Punch-In with 3rd party hardware; 64 voice audio playback; AMA relink enhancements; DNxHD 100, SD JPEG 2K playback; Active Format Description metadata support; ProRes as a native codec
July 2013	macOS, Windows	7.0	FrameFlex; Source side LUTs; Managed AMA; Background file transcode; Waveform caching; Master audio fader; Avid Symphony sold as an optional package to Media Composer
September 2013	macOS, Windows	7.0.2	XDCAM EX 35 capture; Dynamic bin naming
December 2013	macOS, Windows	7.0.3	Setting to enable or disable frame blending in Motion Adapters; New Nvidia drivers support
		7.0.7 (maintenance release)	Bug fixes; This is the final release of Media Composer 7
May 2014	macOS, Windows	8.0.0	Monthly/annual subscription licensing support; Support agreement requirements for future updates; Avid Application Manager introduced
July 2014	macOS, Windows	8.1.0	Support for AAX-64 plug-ins; MXF OP1a export; Frame view border colors and icons; Filter out AMA media in Media Tool; Place a saved title in the timeline; Changes to dragging behaviors; Support for ARRI AMIRA camera
October 2014	macOS, Windows	8.2.0	Background rendering; Favorite bins; Select project window improvements; Quick filter bins in project window; Search for text in marker comment fields; Increase image cache for thumbnails; Warning for project frame rate changes; Application Manager updates; Support for copying DPX files to a DMF folder
December 2014	macOS, Windows	8.3.0	2K & 4K resolution support; Rec. 2020 & DCI-P3 color space support; LUT management and LUT timeline effect; Support for high frame rates; DNxHR Avid codec introduced; Play and render in low res proxy mode; New Blue Titler for high-res projects replacing the title tool; Quick filter items in a bin; List tool replaces EDL Manager and FilmScribe applications; Color info tool; Support for DPX export; Additional column headings; Support for Avid's Artist Series DNxIO I/O hardware
March 2015	macOS, Windows	8.3.1	QuickTime Export for DNxHR; Support for XAVC-I UHD/4K; Export DNxHR as MXF OP1a; Media creation default change; Mac GPU support (certain effects can now be accelerated using GPU hardware on Mac systems.)
January 2016	macOS, Windows	8.5.0	HDR support; Hybrid log–gamma; SMPTE ST 2084; Group by audio waveform
June 2016	macOS, Windows	8.6.0	Source browser; Native support for Panasonic AVC-LongG; Audio ducking; New ways to select segments in timeline; Create sequence based on timeline selection; Nested AudioSuite effects; Audio grouping; Default pan now baked in; SMPTE channel order; Red plugin update; Export with mask margins; Timeline clip comments in timecode generator; Updates to DNxIO
December 2016	macOS, Windows	8.7.0	List tool changes; Audio dupe detection; Extended audio punch in; Sony XAVC LongG; New safe area and safe title options; Rotation presets in FrameFlex; Controlling which track is shown in split view; Audio default pan; Timecode burn-in effect local frame count; Bin enhancements
February 2017	macOS, Windows	8.8.0	Timeline clip notes; Frame cache for effects; ScriptSync v2.0; PhraseFind v2.0; Bin sharing on non-Avid storage; Change to find window; Change to script Window
August 2017	macOS, Windows	8.9.0	Custom Quicktime export audio enhancements; AAC support in Avid generic plug-in; Support for Sony XAVC_L 1080p format; Audio slip; Source browser enhancements; Source/record colors; Automatically open effect editor when adding effect; Pre- and post-roll in CC mode; Position bar snap; Audio mixer redesign; Support for hi-res monitors; Generate LTC on playback; Remote client offset; Update to custom safe action/safe titling setting; Color adapter and FrameFlex icon update
December, 2017	macOS 10.13.2 High Sierra 10.12.6 Sierra 10.11.6 El Capitan 10.10.5 Yosemite Windows 10 Pro/Ent 8.1 Pro/Ent 7 Pro SP1	8.10	New Feature: Syncing based on Waveform Analysis; New devices supported; Bug fixes; Note: This is the final release in the Media Composer 8 series
January 2018	macOS, Windows	2018.1	Avid changed the version numbering starting in January 2018
July 2018	macOS, Windows	2018.7	16K project presets; Live timeline; High frame rate support (100, 119.88, 120 fps); Newtek NDI video over IP support; BXF file support
August 2018	macOS, Windows	2018.8	Exporting to AVC-I Op1A; HDR to SDR conversion features; Avid generic plugin
September 2018	macOS, Windows	2018.9	DNxUncompressed
October 2018	macOS, Windows	2018.10	AVC-LongG support
December 2018	macOS 10.14.2 Mojave 10.13.6 High Sierra 10.12.6 Sierra Windows 10 Pro/Ent 8.1 Pro/Ent 7 Pro SP1	2018.12	First release that includes Avid Titler+; Shape-based color correction (Symphony); Editing group clips; Swap camera bank; Waveform sync inside of the Timeline; Background bin auto-save; 64 tracks of video; Change audio source track in timeline; Note: Support for El Capitan and Yosemite dropped
January 2019	macOS, Windows	2018.12.1	Avid Link introduced, replacing Avid Application Manager; New Feature: effects can now be added to Timeline via in/out points; Upgrades to Titler+; Bug fixes
April 2019	macOS, Windows	2018.12.3 through 2018.12.11	Bug fixes
June 2019	macOS, Windows	2019.6	New user interface; Distributed processing option; MXF Op1A media creation & mixdown; OpenEXR support; IMF support; 32bit floating-point quality; Support for ACES Workflows; Dynamic relink across frame rates
July 2019	macOS, Windows	2019.7	Bug fixes
August 2019	macOS, Windows	2019.8	
September 2019	macOS, Windows	2019.9	UI improvements
November 2019	macOS, Windows	2019.11	Bug fixes
January 2020	macOS, Windows	2019.12.1	Bug fixes
April 2020	macOS, Windows	2020.4	Catalina support; ProRes export (also on PC); Universal Media Engine (UME); Bulk edit; Strip silence; ACES output transforms; DNxHD codec flavors renamed
May 2020	macOS, Windows	2020.5	Bug fixes
June 2020	macOS, Windows	2020.6	Variable-frame-rate media support
August 2020	macOS, Windows	2020.8	Bug fixes
September, 2020	macOS: Catalina 10.15.7 Mojave 10.14.6 High Sierra 10.13.6 Windows 10 v.1809 for Pro/Enterprise	2020.9	Find and Replace (for editing text in bins); New profile support for Bulk Edit feature; "Select Font" now includes Launch Window and Source Browser; New darker UI skin (Interface Brightness setting); Quality Settings change for Mixdowns; Many bug fixes
October, 2020	macOS: Catalina 10.15.7 Mojave 10.14.6 High Sierra 10.13.6 Windows 10 v.1809 for Pro/Enterprise	2020.10	New ability to link to ProRes RAW files
December, 2020	macOS: Big Sur 11.1 Catalina 10.15.7 Mojave 10.14.6 High Sierra 10.13.6 Windows 10 v.1809 for Pro/Enterprise	2020.12	New macOS Big Sur support; New Audio Mixer UI; New ability to map Audio Mixer's Fast Menu items to buttons; Interface update: Timeline background can be adjusted manually (full 0,0,0 black, etc); Transcoding of alpha mattes; H.265 support; Export Media Difference Between Sequences; Updates to Avid Titler+; New feature: Drag bin contents into the Project Tool and Sidebars; Floating Panel Windows allows tools to be containerized; Additional languages for ScriptSync and PhraseFind; Huge list of bug fixes
		2020.12.1 (maintenance release)	Bug fixes
		2020.12.2 (maintenance release)	Bug fixes
		2020.12.3 (maintenance release)	Distributed Processing now supported; Bug fixes
February, 2021	macOS: Big Sur 11.1 Catalina 10.15.7 Mojave 10.14.6 High Sierra 10.13.6 Windows 10 v.1809 for Pro/Enterprise	2021.2	Bug fixes
March, 2021	macOS: Big Sur 11.2.3 & 11.1 Catalina 10.15.7 Mojave 10.14.6 High Sierra 10.13.6 Windows 10 v.1909 for Pro/Enterprise	2021.3	Many interface upgrades; New interface Highlight Colors; "Sync Lock All" button now mappable; New Feature: advancements in moving clips in Timeline with keyboard; "Group Clip Name" now an option in Timeline Clip Text; "Find Bin" now a RT-click directly on a clip in Timeline; Persian language now supported in ScriptSync and PhraseFind; Updates to Titler+; New IMF workflows
May, 2021	macOS: Big Sur 11.2.3 & 11.1 Catalina 10.15.7 Mojave 10.14.6 High Sierra 10.13.6 Windows 10 v.1909 for Pro/Enterprise	2021.5	Bug fixes; Fixes some issues with H.264 handling
June, 2021	macOS: Big Sur 11.4.0, 11.3.1, 11.2.3 & 11.1 Catalina 10.15.7 Mojave 10.14.6 High Sierra 10.13.6 Windows 10 v.1909 for Pro/Enterprise	2021.6	New feature: Go To Next Event and Go To Previous Event; New Feature: Bin Status Bar added Duration; New Feature: Dragging clips into closed folders in Project Tool / Sidebars; Performance enhancement: Improved scrolling in the Timeline; New interface feature: "Save Single-Floating Bin Containers in Workspace"; New interface feature: Workspaces now save as "Last Known" versus "Last Saved"; Updates to Titler+Updates to Distributed Processing; Updates to Media Composer|Enterprise; Bug fixes
September, 2021	macOS: Big Sur 11.x - 11.5.x Catalina 10.15.7 Mojave 10.14.6 Windows 10 v.1909 for Pro/Enterprise	2021.9	New feature: Bin columns can now be resized manually by dragging; Feature adjustment: "Move Clip Leaves Filler" now a checkable option in menu; Bug Fixes
December, 2021	macOS: Monterey 12.1.0 Big Sur 11.x - 11.5.x Catalina 10.15.7 Mojave 10.14.6 Windows 11 RTM Windows 10 2004 for Pro/Enterprise	2021.12	Support for M1, M1 Pro, M1 Max; Support for Windows 11, macOS Monterey, and all Big Sur versions; Feature Update: Rendering AudioSuite Effects; Feature Update: SubCap Font Support; UI Improvement: Dockable Tool Palettes; New Feature: Increased Track Limit (99 video and 99 audio tracks); New Feature: Snap to Grid in Bin Frame View; Feature Update: HW/SW Context Menu
		2020.12.6 (Maintenance release)	Bug fixes.
April, 2022	Mac OS X 12.0–12.3.1 Monterey 11.x–11.6.x Big Sur 10.15.7 Catalina Win 11 64-bit RTM or later Pro and ENT Win 10 64-bit v2004 or later Pro and ENT	2022.4	Command Palette Quick Find; Open IO Support for SRT; Interlaced Format Support for NDI; Avid Titler+ Updates
July, 2022	Mac OS X 12.x up to 12.5.1 Monterey 11.x up to 11.6.x Big Sur 10.15.7 Catalina Win 11 64-bit RTM or later Pro and ENT Win 10 64-bit v2004 or later Pro and ENT	2022.7	New Match Frame Results for Group and MultiGroup Subclips; Custom Workspaces for Multiple Monitor Configurations; New Keyboard Mapping Options for Adobe Premiere Pro and DaVinci Resolve (a great way to help folks with muscle memory in many NLE apps out there); Text Justification Relative to Anchor Point in Titler+; Select Filler with Segment Tools Added to the Timeline Menu; Timeline Clip Notes Display for Nested Clips; New design of the Enablers (the selectables in things like the Effect Editor); Avid Titler+ Updates
October, 2022	Mac OS X 12.x up to 12.5.1 Monterey 11.x up to 11.6.x Big Sur 10.15.7 Catalina Win 11 64-bit RTM or later Pro and ENT Win 10 64-bit v2004 or later Pro and ENT	2022.10	Working with Proxy Media in an Avid NEXIS | EDGE Environment; Media Cache Dialog Update; Multiplex I/O Support for Multiple Open I/O Plug-ins; New Relink Menu and Linked Media Dialog; New Sequence Templates and User Setting; “Choose For Me” Options Added for New Projects; Keyboard Shortcuts to Switch Focus Between Windows and Tabs; Bin Metadata Tooltips; FreeType Font Support for Titler+; Support for Two or More Ganged Groups in the Audio Mixer; Dongles not supported for macOS beginning with Monterey
December 2022	Mac OS X 13.0 - 13.1 Ventura 12.x - 12.5.1 Monterey 11.x up to 11.6.x Big Sur 10.15.7 Catalina Win 11 64-bit RTM or later Pro and ENT Win 10 64-bit v2004 or later Pro and ENT	2022.12	Export Pro Tools Session; Support for Avid MBOX Studio; Mounting UNC Drives in Media Composer; Go to Previous Selected Clip and Go to Next Selected Clip; Creation Date Column Added to Markers Window; Bin Map - state change; Lassoing Bins and Folders in the Bin Container Sidebar; Dragging from Any Column in a Bin; Ignore Multichannel Audio Layout From File; Dongles not supported for macOS beginning with Monterey
March 2023	macOS 13.2.1 Ventura 12.6.x Monterey 11.7 Big Sur 10.15.7 Catalina Win 11 64-bit RTM, 22H2, or later Pro and ENT Win 10 64-bit 20H1, 20H2, 22H2, or later Pro and ENT	2023.3 2023.3.1 (Mac only)	New User Profile and Workspaces to help editors that are transitioning to MC from Premiere; Improvements to Pro Tools Session Export; New "Protect Project Bin" added to Bin Context Menu; NEXIS: Copy media from remote user to NEXIS Workspace; RT-Click to add a folder within a folder; Live Link support for UME; A Mac-only version (2023.3.1) was released to fix some Mac-specific bugs, including some that made advancements in Media Composer's Apple Silicon support.; Dongles not supported for macOS beginning with Monterey
August 2023	macOS 13.0 - 13.5 Ventura 12.6.x Monterey 11.7 Big Sur 10.15.7 Catalina Win 11 64-bit RTM, 22H2, or later Pro and Enterprise Win 10 64-bit 20H1, 20H2, 22H2, or later Pro and Enterprise	2023.8	The following are new for Media Composer v2023.8: • AI-Enhanced ScriptSync and PhraseFind • Media Composer Classic User Profile and Workspace • Panel SDK • Audio Punch-in Using USB Audio Devices with Video Hardware • Batch Subclip Tool • Display Middle Composer Button Panel • Changing Monitor Configuration Duplicates Current Workspaces • Apply Sequence Template to an Existing Sequence • Keyboard Shortcuts Added to Command Button Tooltips • Clip Gain Extended to 36 dB in Media Composer • “LFE Only” Mono Tracks • Track Effect Bypass • Device Selection for Desktop Audio Output • Multi-Mix Tool Options Added to Pro Tools Session Export Settings • GOP Options Added to XDCAM Export to Device • Optimized EDL with Four Audio Tracks Dongles not supported for macOS beginning with Monterey
December 2023	macOS 14.0 to 14.1.x Sonoma 13.x to 13.6.x Ventura 12.x to 12.7.x Monterey 11.x to 11.7.x Big Sur 10.15.7 Catalina Windows 11 64-bit 21H1 or later (Professional and Enterprise) Windows 10 64-bit 21H1 or later (Professional and Enterprise)	2023.12	Batch Subclip Tool Adds Support for Sequences; Export Transcript to Text File; Export to M4A Container with AAC File Format; QuickTime Import for Systems without QuickTime Installed; SRT Optimizations; PhraseFind AI and ScriptSync AI Fully Supported; Avid Huddle Support; Dongles not supported for macOS beginning with Monterey
February 2024	macOS 14.0 to 14.3.x Sonoma 13.x to 13.6.x Ventura 12.x to 12.7.x Monterey Windows 11 64-bit 21H1 or later (Professional and Enterprise) Windows 10 64-bit 21H1 or later (Professional and Enterprise)	2024.2	Transcription Database Available Across Multiple Projects; Export Transcript and Export SubCap from a Sequence; Speaker ID added to transcript Exports; Transcript Settings for Language Hint Selection; Display Source Track Name in Timeline; Public Preview: OpenTimelineIO (for VFX and online workflows)
June 2024	macOS 14.x to 14.5.x Sonoma 13.x to 13.6.x Ventura 12.x to 12.7.x Monterey Windows 11 64-bit 22H2 or later (Professional and Enterprise) Windows 10 64-bit 22H2 or later (Professional and Enterprise)	2024.6	New features: Better interoperability with Pro Tools: Import Pro Tools Session (PTXM) into Media Composer; Expanded Marker Colors (from 8 to 16) and Fields; Sub-frame automation for Volume and Pan controls; OpenTimeline: Update to the Public Preview of OpenTimelineIO (OTIO) using List Tool; New transcription tools: Transcription Tool - a new, live transcription window (requires PhraseFind); Subclips and Groups - reference the Transcript for Master Clips; Manage Transcription of clips per bin
October 2024	macOS 14.x to 14.7.x Sonoma 13.x to 13.6.x Ventura 12.x to 12.7.x Monterey Windows 11 64-bit 22H2 or later (Professional and Enterprise) Windows 10 64-bit 22H2 or later (Professional and Enterprise)	2024.10	New features: Titler+ revamp and improvements: Enhanced performance and stability; Upgraded user experience; New coordinate system and anchor points; Better font and language support; More transform options; Simplified rolls and crawls; Animatable parameters; Tracking integration; Timeline Waveform Views Spot to Timecode Transcript Tool enhancements (requires PhraseFind) List Tool now supports outputting files as Unicode Marker Tool performance improvements Support for Sequence Template in NRCS Window
December 2024	macOS 15.x to 15.15 Sequoia 14.x to 14.7.x Sonoma 13.x to 13.7.x Ventura Windows 11 64-bit 22H2 or later (Professional and Enterprise) Windows 10 64-bit 22H2 or later (Professional and Enterprise) *Important: NEXIS is not yet supporting Sequoia. So, if you are running MC attached to a NEXIS, do NOT upgrade to Sequoia yet.	2024.12	New Features: First version of Media Composer to run natively on Apple Silicon (ARM); Source Side Waveforms; Pausing Background Transcription While Editing; Note: This version is the maintenance release for the 2024 series. It was released in February, 2025.
June 2025	macOS 15.3.1 Sequoia 14.x to 14.7.x Sonoma 13.x to 13.7.x Ventura Windows 11 64-bit 22H2 or later (Professional and Enterprise) Windows 10 64-bit 22H2 or later (Professional and Enterprise)	2025.6	New Features: Proxy Workflow (need Ultimate license); On-Prem Avid NEXIS Support for Proxy Workflow; Transcript Settings and Transcript Tool UI Improvements; Delete Transcripts; Single Transcript Index; MediaCentral Transcription Interop; Avid Titler+ Clip Text Labels; Avid Titler+ EDL Export for Titles; Use Marks Option for Create SubCap; AutoSequence and Spot to Timecode Use Camera Column; OpenTimelineIO Import Support; Quality Levels for AVC Long GOP Codec Family; HDR Relink
December 2025	macOS: 26.x (Tahoe); 15.x to 15.7.x (Sequoia); 14.x to 14.8.x (Sonoma); 13.x to 13.7.x (Ventura); Windows: Windows 11 64-bit 22H2 or later (Professional and Enterprise)	2025.12	New Features: Waveform Map Alongside Video; Avid Titler+ Template Workflow; Edit Transcription Text; Peer-to-Peer Transcript Sharing; Full Resolution Multi-Cam Output; DNx 4.0 Codec; Marker Improvements; Extensions (replaces Panel SDK)
August 2026	macOS: 26.2 to 26.6 (Tahoe); 15.x to 15.7.x (Sequoia); 14.x to 14.8.x (Sonoma); Windows: Windows 11 64-bit 22H2 or later (Professional and Enterprise)	2026.8	New Features: Shared Projects on third-party shared storage; PhraseFind Multicam Auto Cut; Transcript Editing and Versioning; Change Source Track for Subclips; Choose Columns Filter and Navigation; Keyframe Behavior Improvements in Titler+
Date	Operating Systems	Version	Description
