= Truevision =

Former American digital video business

Truevision, Inc.
- Industry: Electronics
- Headquarters: Indianapolis, Indiana, United States, United States

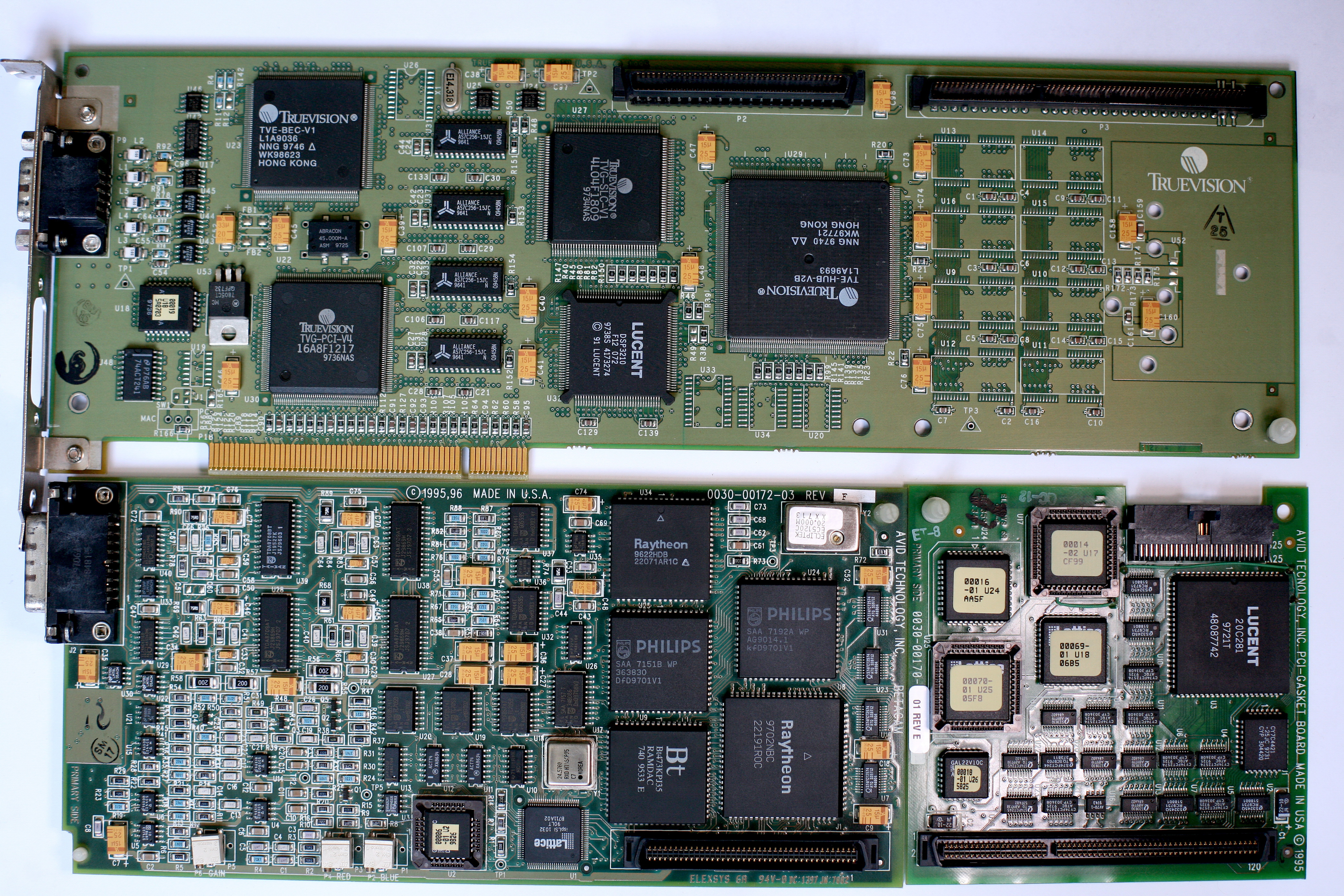
Circuit card manufactured by Truevision

Truevision, Inc. was a maker of digital video processing add-on boards for PC computers. It was founded by 29 former employees of AT&T's Electronic Photography and Imaging Center (EPICenter). AT&T dissolved this division in 1987. Located in Indianapolis, Indiana, Truevision was later acquired by monitor and graphics card maker RasterOps Corporation of Santa Clara, California, in 1992. RasterOps took on the Truevision name and retained the Indianapolis engineering team, which continued producing increasingly more advanced products, until 1999 when the company was finally acquired by its biggest competitor, Pinnacle Systems. Pinnacle Systems was later acquired by Avid Technology, which initially used the AT-Vista when it was a two-person startup company.

== History ==
The administrative hierarchy of Truevision developed into a triumvirate shortly after its inception. Joseph Haaf became VP of Sales and Marketing, Carl Calabria was VP of engineering, Cathleen Asch was VP of Administration and Accounting. Each had equal voting power in corporate decisions-making. The company was privately held by employees until purchased by RasterOps in 1992.

Beginning as AT&T EPICenter with still-image frame grabber cards like the ICB (image capture board), Truevision Inc. went on to pioneer the desktop digital video editing industry with the introduction of the TARGA videographics card in 1987. Its engineers developed brand new ASICs that were eventually powerful enough to perform real-time operations on live video microscopy, which culminated in the TARGA 2000 digital video processing board in 1998. These HUB chips operated with a memory-centric architecture that simplified the task of third-party developers to integrate TARGA boards into their products. Most notable were Japanese companies Sony and Matsushita (Panasonic), who used TARGA in the heart of several of their video editing workstations.

== See also ==
- Truevision TGA
