= Xpress Pro =

Non-linear video editing software

- Xpress Pro edits both standard definition and low-mid-range high definition video
- Developer: Avid Technology
- Final release: 5.8.4
- Operating system: Windows, Mac OS X
- Type: Video editing software
- License: Proprietary

Avid Xpress Pro was a non-linear video editing software aimed at professionals in the TV and movie industry. It was available for Microsoft Windows PCs and Apple Macintosh computers.

== Features ==
Xpress Pro included many of the high-end editing features offered by other Avid editing systems, and was closely based on Avid's Media Composer systems. In conjunction with the Avid Mojo hardware, it provided real-time uncompressed video editing at a professional level. Xpress Pro was capable of sharing media files with Avid's advanced Media Composer editing systems making it a capable logging or offline editing system for larger projects.

While Xpress Pro was originally aimed at DV and uncompressed standard definition editors, the upgrade to Xpress Pro HD with version 5.0 of the software added support for high-definition editing with the 8-bit version of Avid's DNxHD codec or Panasonic's DVCPRO HD codec, and version 5.2 added support for HDV editing. Unlike some other editing packages, Xpress Pro HD edits HDV natively by decompressing the MPEG-2 stream on the fly, rather than transcoding into an intraframe codec.

== Discontinuation ==
Xpress Pro was discontinued on March 17, 2008, and was no longer for sale after June 30, 2008. Avid offered Xpress Pro users a discounted upgrade price for their flagship non-linear editing software Media Composer.

One of the controversial aspects of the software was that it did not work on Microsoft's Windows Vista.

== See also ==
- Final Cut Studio
