= Horacio Bocaranda =

American film director

Steve Bocaranda
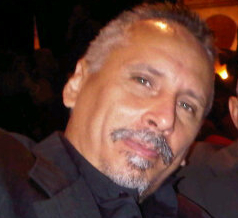
- Born: Horacio Bocaranda; January 6, 1965 (age 61); Valencia, Carabobo, Venezuela
- Occupations: Film director, producer, screenwriter
- Years active: 1992–present

Horacio Bocaranda is a Venezuelan–American television and film director, also known as Steve Bocaranda or Steve Horacio Bocaranda.

Bocaranda began studying Broadcasting in 1985 at the California State University, Los Angeles and started working for television station KRCA channel 22, Los Angeles, in the early 1990s, then worked for television station Channel 62 in the 1990s. He has worked in several US television stations as well as radio. On Univision, he worked in "El Gordo y La Flaca" a daily show, and made several TV commercials, including Ingles Sin Barreras.

He received several recognition. He won Orquidea's Gold Director Destacado (Director Prize) and is considered one of the best Venezuelan film director by his colleagues.

== Director of commercials ==
He acted not only as director but also as actor and publisher, with more than 1300 commercials ones for the United States and Latin America.

- Codetel International
- Verizon
- Blackstone
- Univision
- Telemundo
- Telefutura
- Canal 41 (America TEVE)
- Canal 22 (WDLP)

== Television work - Producer ==
- Producer, Billboard Music Awards (NBC)
- Producer, Quién tiene la razón (Oakland Entertainment)
- Producer, Jose Luis sin censura (KRCA Canal 62 Los Angeles)
- Producer, Al Rojo Vivo (Telemundo)
- Producer, La Corte del Pueblo (Telemundo)
- Producer, Que Buena TV (Con El Carnalillo) (KRCA Canal 62 Los Angeles)
- General Producer, Agua y Chocolate (Hispanic TV Network)
- General Producer, A Tu Salud (Hispanic TV Network)
- General Producer, Marta Susana, Venevision Internacional
- General Producer, Maria Elvira Confronta (America TEVE Canal 41 Miami)
- General Producer, Maria Elvira Confronta (WDLP Canal 22 Miami)

== TV Announcer ==
- Al Rojo Vivo (Telemundo)
- Que Bodas (Gordo Y La Flaca, Univision)
- Marta Susana, Venevision International)
- Wow El Programa TV, Bocaranda Show Productions, Inc.
- Wow Podcast, 2004. Bocaranda Show Productions, Inc.
- The News Podcast En Español, 2004. Bocaranda Show Productions, Inc.
- Audio y Video Podcast, 2005. Bocaranda Show Productions, Inc.
- Arroz Con Mango, 2006. Bocaranda Show Productions, Inc.
- Nissan. Bocaranda Show Productions, Inc.
- Comerciales, Bocaranda Show Productions, Inc.
- Comerciales, Hard Rock Cafe

== Filmography - Director ==
- The Celibacy (2010)
- Imigrantes (2004)
- My lover (2003)
- Los Caminos difíciles (2001)
- La Magia (1999)

== Latin Grammy Awards ==
In 2009 Horacio Bocaranda was a judge for the Latin Grammy Awards in the category of Film/TV/Media and as of today he is a member of "The Recording Academy".
