= Avid Technology =

American multimedia technology company

Avid Technology, Inc.
- Company type: Private
- Traded as: Nasdaq: AVID (until 2023)
- Industry: Computer software, Technology, Multimedia
- Founded: August 1987; 38 years ago
- Founder: Bill Warner
- Headquarters: Burlington, Massachusetts, United States
- Key people: Wellford Dillard (CEO)
- Products: Pro Tools, Media Composer, Sibelius, Avid Play Avid VENUE, Avid NEXIS, MediaCentral, FastServe, MBOX Studio, Pro Tools Carbon, Pro Tools MTRX, Airspeed, Avid Maestro Graphics.
- Revenue: ▲US$417 million (2022)
- Operating income: ▲US$53.9 million (2022)
- Net income: ▲US$55.2 million (2022)
- Total assets: ▲US$287 million (2022)
- Owner: Symphony Technology Group
- Website: www.avid.com

Avid Technology, Inc. is a global technology company whose products are mainly used in the media and entertainment industry. Founded in 1987, it is headquartered in Burlington, Massachusetts, and develops software, SaaS, and hardware products.

== History ==
Avid was founded in August 1987 by Bill Warner, a former marketing manager from Apollo Computer.

A prototype of their first non-linear editing system, the Avid/1 Media Composer, was shown at the National Association of Broadcasters (NAB) convention in April 1988. The Avid/1 was based on an Apple Macintosh II computer, with special hardware and software of Avid's design installed. The Avid/1 was "the biggest shake-up in editing since Melies played with time and sequences in the early 1900s".

By the early 1990s, Avid products began to replace such tools as the Moviola, Steenbeck, and KEM flatbed editors, allowing editors to handle their film creations with greater ease. The first feature film edited using the Avid was Let's Kill All the Lawyers in 1992, directed by Ron Senkowski. The film was edited at a 30fps NTSC rate, then used Avid MediaMatch to generate a negative cutlist from the EDL. The first feature film edited natively at 24fps with what was to become the Avid Film Composer was Emerson Park. The first studio film to be edited at 24fps was Lost in Yonkers, directed by Martha Coolidge.

By 1994 only three feature films used the new digital editing system. By 1995 dozens had switched to Avid, and it signaled the beginning of the end of cutting celluloid. In 1996 Walter Murch accepted the Academy Award for editing The English Patient (which also won best picture), which he cut on the Avid. This was the first Editing Oscar awarded to a digitally edited film (although the final print was still created with traditional negative cutting).

Avid logo, 1999-2008

In 1994 Avid introduced Open Media Framework (OMF) as an open standard file format for sharing media and related metadata.

Over the years, Avid has released numerous freeware versions of Media Composer. Initially this included Avid Free DV: a free edition of Media Composer with limited functionality; Avid Xpress DV: a consumer edition of Media Composer; and then Avid Xpress Pro: a prosumer edition of Media Composer. These editions were discontinued in 2008 as the flagship Media Composer was lowered in price. Later, Avid released Media Composer | First, which included a large portion of Media Composer's functionality but its exporting workflows publishing finished videos directly to web services like YouTube.

On March 29, 1999, Avid Technology, Inc. adjusted the amount originally allocated to IPR&D and restated its third-quarter 1998 consolidated financial statements accordingly, considering the SEC's views.

In February 2018, Avid appointed Jeff Rosica as CEO, after terminating Louis Hernandez Jr, who was accused of workplace misconduct.

In November 2023, Avid Technology was acquired by an affiliate of STG for $1.4 billion. This process delisted Avid from the public stock exchange, making it private.

In April 2024, Avid appointed Wellford Dillard as CEO, succeeding Jeff Rosica.

== Products ==
- Media Composer
- Pro Tools
- Sibelius

== Awards ==
1993: The National Academy of Television Arts & Sciences awarded Avid Technology and all of the company's initial employees with a technical Emmy award for Outstanding Engineering Development for the Avid Media Composer video editing system.

1999: At the 71st Academy Awards, Avid Technology Inc. was awarded an Oscar for the concept, system design and engineering of the Avid Film Composer for motion picture editing which was accepted by founder Bill Warner.

== Acquisitions ==
Acquired	Company	Details	Sold
1993	EditDroid	A computerized analog non-linear editing (NLE) system which was developed by Lucasfilm spin-off company.	
1993	DiVA Corporation	developer of Videoshop, Quicktime-based home video editing software	
1994	Digidesign	developer of Pro Tools, digital audio workstation, and Venue, brand of digital mixing consoles	
1994	Basys	ITN's newsroom computer and automation system (from Digital Equipment Corporation), then implemented into iNews in 2001	
1994	Newsview	Novell-based newsroom computer system	
1995	Elastic Reality, Inc.	developer of Elastic Reality, morphing software	
1995	Parallax Software	developer of Matador, Illusion and Jester, ink-and-paint software	
1998	Softimage	developer of Softimage|3D, 3D graphics software (previously subsidiary of Microsoft)	2008 (to Autodesk)
1998	NewStar	strategic alliance Avstar with Grass Valley—then owners of Lightworks	
2000	Motion Factory	developer of interactive 3D software for games and the Web	
2000	Pluto Technology	DDR playback servers	
2002	iKnowledge	developer of Active Content Manager, newsroom management software	
2003	Rocket Networks	private sharing network technology for Internet collaboration, then implemented in Digidelivery, encrypted file transfer system	2007 (to Aspera)
2004	NXN	Media Asset Management software components	
2004	Bomb Factory	audio plug-ins developer	
2004	M-Audio	audio interfaces and equipment manufacturer	2012 (to inMusic)
2005	Pinnacle Systems	digital video hardware and software manufacturer	2012 (to Corel)
2005	Wizoo	virtual instrument, plug-in effect and sample library designer; developed AIR (Advanced Instrument Research), series of plug-ins and virtual instruments subsequently included in Pro Tools	2012 (to inMusic)
2006	Medéa Corporation	high-speed RAID storage manufacturer	
2006	Sundance Digital	broadcast automation software	
2006	Sibelius Software	developer of Sibelius, notation software	
2006	Maximum Throughput	developer of MAXedit, visual effects editing software	
2010	Blue Order Solutions AG	Media asset management software	
2010	Euphonix	digital mixing console and control surface manufacturer; EuCon protocols were integrated into Pro Tools; the Artist Series and System 5 Family were added to Avid control surfaces	
2012	Rocket Network	provides online music recording studios	
2015	Orad Systems	developer of 3D real-time graphics and video servers products, then integrated into the MediaCentral Platform	
2024	Wolftech	provider of story-centric workflow management solutions to large broadcasters, enhancing collaboration and efficiency in news gathering & story creation	

== See also ==
- List of music software
- List of video editing software
- List of scorewriters
