= Host controller interface =

Host Controller Interface or Host controller interface may refer to:

- Host Controller Interface (FireWire), an interface that enables a FireWire host controller to communicate with a driver
- Host Controller Interface (USB), an interface that enables a USB host controller to communicate with a driver
- Host Controller Interface (Bluetooth) in Bluetooth protocols
- Host Controller Interface (non-volatile memory), an interface that enables SATA Express / NVM Express SSDs to communicate with a driver

== See also ==
- Host adapter
- Advanced Host Controller Interface (AHCI)
- Enhanced Host Controller Interface (EHCI)
- Non-Volatile Memory Host Controller Interface (NVMHCI)
- Open Host Controller Interface (OHCI)
- Universal Host Controller Interface (UHCI)
- Wireless Host Controller Interface (WHCI)
- Extensible Host Controller Interface (XHCI)
