= Lightbits Labs =

American software company

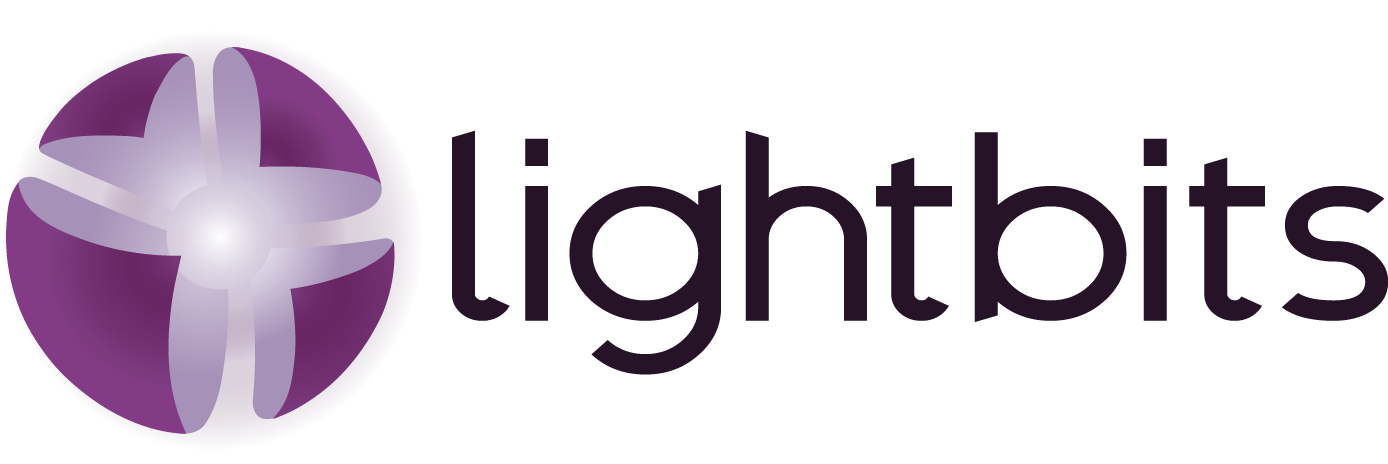
- Industry: Software
- Founded: 2016
- Founders: Avigdor Willenz; Eran Kirzner; Kam Eshghi; Muli Ben-Yehuda; Ofir Efrati; Fabian Trumper
- Headquarters: San Jose, California, United States
- Key people: Eran Kirzner (CEO)
- Website: lightbitslabs.com

Lightbits Labs is an American software company based in San Jose, California. The company is the developer of NVMe over TCP standard.

== History ==
Lightbits Labs was founded in 2016 by Avigdor Willenz, Eran Kirzner, Kam Eshghi, Muli Ben-Yehuda, Ofir Efrati, and Fabian Trumper with an initial funding of $10 million. Initially, Lightbits invented and standardized NVMe/TCP standard and built the first commercial NVMe/TCP storage platform.

In March 2019, Lightbits Labs received $50 million investment from Dell EMC, Cisco, Micron Technology and others. In November 2019, NVM Express approved the NVMe/TCP storage protocol that was jointly developed by Lightbits. In the same year, Lightbits also released storage software capable of running NVMe over TCP.

In September 2020, Intel made an investment in Lightbits. Later, Lightbits also formed a partnership with Intel to develop a disaggregated storage platform for data centers.

In June 2022, Lightbits received $42 million in a funding round, including from JP Morgan Chase. In October 2022, Lenovo Group also invested in Lightbits.

== Products ==
Lightbits develops software-defined storage for data center and cloud environments. Its LightOS platform provides block storage for on-premises, public cloud, and hybrid environments and is built around NVMe/TCP. The platform supports the distribution of NVMe data transfer queues across multiple parallel connections, with reported access latencies of 100 to 120 microseconds, or about 200 microseconds when deployed on commodity servers.

For on-premises use, LightOS can run on standard x86 servers in bare-metal or VMware ESXi environments. In public cloud environments, it is available on AWS, Microsoft Azure, and Azure VMware. The platform also supports license portability between private and public infrastructure, which can be used during hybrid cloud migrations.

LightOS integrates with orchestration and virtualization environments including Kubernetes through CSI, KubeVirt, OpenShift-V, and OpenStack. The platform manages flash storage to support throughput, latency, and SSD endurance. Its availability features include three-way data replication across separate failure domains, continued operation during node or drive failures, and support for rolling software upgrades.

Inferra is a KV cache acceleration engine for LLM infrastructure. It uses tiered storage, attention prefetching, and scheduling optimizations to manage KV cache capacity. It also includes encrypted data transfer, Quality of Service controls, and workload isolation features for memory and context handling.
