= HCD =

HCD or hcd may refer to:

== Science and technology ==
- Hectocandela (hcd), a unit of luminous intensity
- Higher-energy collisional dissociation, a mass spectrometry technique
- Highest common divisor
- Host controller driver, for a Host controller interface (USB, Firewire)
- Human-centered design

== Other uses ==
- HC Davos, a Swiss ice hockey club
- California Department of Housing and Community Development, US
