= ArcaOS =

Operating system based on OS/2

- ArcaOS 5.0.5 desktop
- Developer: Arca Noae, LLC (based on code from IBM, Microsoft, and other developers)
- Written in: C, C++, REXX, Java, assembly language
- OS family: OS/2
- Working state: Current
- Source model: Closed source with open-source components
- Initial release: May 15, 2017; 9 years ago
- Latest release: 5.1.2 / March 8, 2026; 8 months ago
- Available in: English, German, Spanish, Russian
- Package manager: ANPM (based on RPM and YUM)
- Supported platforms: 32-bit x86
- Kernel type: Hybrid
- Default user interface: Workplace Shell, cmd
- License: Proprietary software
- Official website: www.arcanoae.com

ArcaOS is a proprietary operating system based on OS/2, developed and marketed by Arca Noae, LLC under license from IBM. It was first released in 2017 and builds on OS/2 Warp 4.52 by adding support for new hardware, fixing defects and limitations in the operating system, and by including new applications and tools, and includes some Linux/Unix tool compatibility. It is aimed at users who need to run existing OS/2 applications on current hardware.

Like OS/2 Warp, ArcaOS is a 32-bit, single-user, preemptive multitasking operating system for the x86 architecture, with support for symmetric multiprocessing; it can run on physical hardware or in a virtual machine.

== Features ==
=== Hardware compatibility ===
ArcaOS supports symmetric multiprocessing systems with up to 64 processor cores, although it is recommended to disable hyperthreading. As of version 5.0.8, ArcaOS is ACPI 6.1-compliant and includes the 20220331 release of ACPICA.

Although ArcaOS is a 32-bit operating system, it has limited PAE support that allows it to use RAM in excess of 4GB as a RAM disk.

ArcaOS supports being run as a virtual machine guest inside VirtualBox, VMware ESXi, VMWare Workstation and Microsoft Virtual PC.

The minimum system requirements for ArcaOS 5.1 are a Pentium Pro or AMD K6 processor, 256MB of RAM, and 2GB of disk space; it can boot on systems with a traditional BIOS or UEFI firmware.

In addition to the device drivers included with OS/2 Warp 4, ArcaOS includes a variety of drivers developed by Arca Noae, and various third parties:

- Network adapters are supported either with Arca Noae's MultiMac technology, which employs FreeBSD driver code, or a selection of GenMAC drivers. Support for wireless networking is limited.
- ArcaOS replaces the 16-bit IBM OS/2 USB driver with a new 32-bit driver capable of supporting USB 2.0 and USB 3.0 controllers.
- Audio support utilizes the Uniaud generic audio driver, now maintained by Arca Noae. Uniaud is based on the ALSA framework from the Linux kernel. In addition, a selection of device-specific drivers are included with ArcaOS.
- Video support is provided by Panorama generic unaccelerated VESA driver, or SNAP accelerated video driver. Features such as acceleration and multi-head are supported for a limited number of graphics chipsets.
- Storage drivers are available for IDE, AHCI, NVMe and a number of SCSI adapters.
- Support for printers is provided by the eCups project, which is based on the open-source Common Unix Printing System.

=== Software ===
Some of the open source software included with ArcaOS - Firefox, Lucide, 4OS2, PMDCalc Plus

In addition to the software bundled with OS/2 Warp 4, ArcaOS includes some additional software, such as:

- Mozilla Firefox and Thunderbird 45
- Apache OpenOffice 4.1
- Lucide, an open source document viewer
- XWorkplace, a set of open source enhancements to the Workplace Shell
- 4OS2
- OpenJDK 6
- Qt 4 and 5
- Samba 4
- Heimdal Kerberos
- VirtualBox
- REXX and ooRexx interpreters

The bundled Firefox port is based on version 45, as later versions depend on compiler features that are not available on OS/2. In 2022, a donation-funded port of the Qt-based Otter Browser was developed for OS/2 and ArcaOS by bitwiseworks GmbH and the OS/2 VOICE user group, intended to succeed the aging Firefox port.

=== Cross-platform compatibility ===
Some of the compatibility subsystems in ArcaOS - a Bash shell (bottom left), QBASIC in a DOS window (middle), and the Windows 3.1 Program Manager (top right)

ArcaOS includes a number of software components that allow it to directly run software developed for other operating systems, and to simplify the process of porting software to ArcaOS:

- ArcaOS includes OS/2's MVDM and WIN-OS/2, allowing ArcaOS to run 16-bit MS-DOS and Windows 3.1 applications natively. ArcaOS features some improvements to these subsystems that are not found in OS/2, such as the ability to access volumes greater than 2GB from Windows and DOS, as well as supporting 16-bit Windows and DOS software on UEFI systems that do not have a traditional BIOS.
- ArcaOS includes Odin, based on Wine, which provides a subset of the Win32 API. Odin can be used to run certain Win32 applications directly, while other applications, such as the OS/2 port of OpenJDK, use the Odin API to simplify porting Windows software to OS/2.
- ArcaOS provides a Unix compatibility layer named kLIBC that facilitates the porting of open source Linux applications to ArcaOS. A variety of Linux tools ship with ArcaOS such as the Bash shell and the GNU coreutils, while others are available through the ArcaOS package manager, such as GCC.
- A port of OpenJDK is included, which allows ArcaOS to run Java applications that do not have platform-specific dependencies.

=== Filesystems ===
ArcaOS's default filesystem is JFS, although HPFS is also supported for backwards compatibility. ArcaOS may be installed to and booted from either filesystem.

FAT12, FAT16, and FAT32 are also supported using either the OS/2 kernel's own FAT driver, or a new Arca Noae-developed FAT32 IFS driver, included in ArcaOS since version 5.0.3. ArcaOS includes support for optical disc filesystems such as ISO 9660 and UDF.

ArcaOS supports serving and accessing CIFS/SMB shares using the open source Samba project, and provides a graphical utility named ArcaMapper to manage configuration.

NetDrive for OS/2 provides access to a variety of additional filesystems such as NTFS and NFS via its own IFS driver.

=== Installation and updates ===
The hardware configuration screen from the ArcaOS installer

ArcaOS features a new graphical installer that replaces the IBM installer used in OS/2 Warp; it can be booted directly from optical media or from a USB flash drive, and can also update an existing ArcaOS installation in place. Installation and updates of individual software packages is provided through the Arca Noae Package Manager (ANPM), a native OS/2 graphical frontend on top of RPM and YUM.

== History ==
=== Blue Lion ===
Arca Noae was founded by developers from the eComStation community who felt that development of that earlier OS/2 distribution had stalled; eComStation's planned version 2.2 never reached general availability following management problems at its distributor Mensys. ArcaOS was nevertheless developed directly from OS/2 Warp 4.52 rather than from eComStation code. ArcaOS was formally announced on October 23, 2015, at the Warpstock 2015 event (an OS/2 user group event) under the code name "Blue Lion" by Arca Noae's Managing Member, Lewis Rosenthal. Features announced at the time included a new symmetric multiprocessing kernel, a new installer supporting installation from USB flash drives and across a network, the device drivers already produced by Arca Noae under its driver subscription service, updated Workplace Shell and printing subsystems, and localization in several languages besides English.

=== ArcaOS 5.0 ===
The name "ArcaOS" was first published in a TechRepublic article on May 26, 2016. In the same TechRepublic article, Lewis Rosenthal was quoted as saying that the first release of ArcaOS would be version 5.0, as it follows onto the last release of OS/2 Warp from IBM, which was 4.52 (also known as Merlin Convenience Pack 2, or MCP2).

ArcaOS 5.0 was released May 15, 2017. There were two editions released: a commercial edition, intended for enterprise use, and a lower-priced personal edition, targeted at non-business users.

ArcaOS 5.0 was followed by a number of maintenance releases between 2017 and 2023. In addition to bug fixes and driver updates, the maintenance releases added some significant features such as USB 3.0 support, support for NVMe drives, the ability to install from a USB drive, and the update facility.

=== ArcaOS 5.1 ===
Prior to the release of ArcaOS 5.0, ArcaOS 5.1 was originally planned for release in 2017 with a focus on providing localized releases for languages other than English, referred to as National Language Versions (NLVs). ArcaOS 5.1.0 was released on August 27, 2023, adding support for booting on UEFI Class 3 systems, and support for GUID partition tables — allowing for disks larger than OS/2's previous 2TB size limit. This was followed by the 5.1.1 release in February 2025, which added the first NLVs for German, Spanish and Russian.

=== Release history ===
ArcaOS releases
Release	Date	Major changes
5.0	2017-05-15	First public release of ArcaOS
5.0.1	2017-07-09	Installer fixes and driver updates
5.0.2	2018-02-10	Added ability to boot from USB media
5.0.3	2018-08-19	Updates to software and drivers
5.0.4	2019-07-21	Update facility that allows ArcaOS to be updated without reinstalling
5.0.5	2020-06-06	USB 3.0/xHCI support
5.0.6	2020-08-31	Installer fixes and updates
5.0.7	2021-12-07	NVMe driver
5.0.8	2023-06-01	Support for NVMe drives in installer and preboot environment
5.1.0	2023-08-27	Support for UEFI Class 3 hardware, and GPT partitions
5.1.1	2025-02-16	NLV support for German, Spanish, and Russian
5.1.2	2026-03-08	Improved UEFI/GPT support
