= IvsEdits =

ivsEdits
- Developer: IVS
- Initial release: 2008; 18 years ago
- Stable release: ivsEdits 5.0.607 / March 6, 2017; 8 years ago
- Operating system: Windows
- Platform: IA-32
- Size: 130 MB
- Available in: English and Italian
- Type: Non-linear editing system
- License: Freemium
- Website: www.ivsedits.com

ivsEdits is a professional video editing software / non-linear editing system (NLE) made in Italy by IVS. ivsEdits supports editing and mastering of PAL, NTSC, HD, 2K and 4K clips and projects. It was released as a commercial software in the 2008 soon after its first international show at IBC 2008. It was reviewed by the high-definition video magazine HDVideoPro in the December 2009.

== Overview ==
ivsEdits is a resolution independent and "timeline based" video editor, featuring advanced editing tools, realtime effects, LIVE features, like up to 4 Live inputs, Live non Linear Multicamera Editing and remote of DMX Devices (lights, smoke machines, et.c). It supports several file formats and codecs as well as Blackmagic Design I/O cards and FireWire/iLink OHCI devices.

== Free version ==
Five years after the commercial version, a free version called ivsEditsLE was released in 2013. Its download is available on several free download sites, as well as on the official ivsEdits website. ivsEditsLE features the same editing toolset of the commercial version, but has some limitations in the number of natively supported video codecs and doesn't include some additional software (integrated CG, file transcoding and professional TV playout). The licence is freeware/closed source; the software is free and can be used without a cost for an unlimited time.

== Uses ==
ivsEdits has been used in movies and TV shows, including:

- JVC HM-70 Video review
- The Knights of the Lagoon by Walter Bencini
- Valentina Blanca & Rick Wakeman - "La Bambola di pezza"
- PattoMC - Rint e' man - Music Video

== See also ==
- List of video editing software
