= Odin (code conversion software) =

Project to run Windows on OS/2 formats

- Initial release: 1999
- Stable release: 0.9.0 / 28 July 2017; 8 years ago
- License: Proprietary
- Website: trac.netlabs.org/odin32
- Repository: trac.netlabs.org/odin32/browser

Odin (known before as Win32-OS/2) is a project to run Microsoft Windows programs on OS/2 or convert them to OS/2 native format. It also provides the Odin32 API to compile Win32 (Windows API) programs for OS/2. The project's goals are:

- Every Windows program should load and operate properly.
- Create a complete OS/2 implementation of the Win32 API.

Although this is far from complete, much of the Win32 API is not widely used, so partial implementation will give usable results. Odin32 is already used commercially for the OS/2 port of the Opera web browser. Odin is included in the ArcaOS operating system.

== Technical overview ==
Odin achieves binary compatibility by converting Win32 executables and dynamic-link libraries to OS/2 format. Conversion can be done on the fly (each time the application is run) or permanently. Odin does not use emulation or a compatibility layer.

Odin identifies itself to Windows applications as Windows 2000 Service Pack 2.

Odin uses code from Wine, which runs Win32 applications on Unix-like operating systems.

== Name ==
The project is named after Odin, the god of wisdom and supreme god of Germanic and Norse mythology.
