= Avigdor Willenz =

Israeli entrepreneur

- אביגדור וילנץ
- Born: 1957 (age 68–69); Rehovot, Israel
- Education: Technion – Israel Institute of Technology (Electrical Engineering)
- Occupations: Entrepreneur, venture capitalist, philanthropist
- Known for: Founder of Galileo Technologies, Habana Labs
- Board member of: Habana Labs (former); Lightbits Labs

Avigdor Willenz (Hebrew: אביגדור וילנץ; born in 1957, Rehovot, Israel) is an Israeli entrepreneur in the electronics field, venture capitalist, billionaire, and philanthropist.

== Early life and education ==
Avigdor Willenz was born in 1957 in Rehovot. He studied at Hebrew University High School and then dropped out. After a pre-military service year in Kibbutz Raim, he served in the IDF as an officer in the Armored Corps during the First Lebanon War, as a tank platoon deputy commander in the 362nd Battalion, among other roles in the Sultan Yacoub battle. Willenz is a graduate of the Technion in Electrical Engineering.

== Career ==
He began his professional career in the early 1980s at Elbit, where he worked on developing computer infrastructures for the Lavi and F-16 combat aircraft. In 1988, he moved to the United States for residence, during which he specialized in developing half-conductor devices, resigned from Elbit, and joined Integrated Device Technology (IDT). At IDT, Willenz met Manuel Alba, who became his partner in companies he later founded. After three and a half years in the United States, he returned to Israel.

In 1993, he founded Galileo Technologies, which develops VLSI components. In 1997, Willenz took Galileo public on NASDAQ, and in October 2000, he led its sale to the American company Marvell Technology, which paid $2.7 billion for 25% of Galileo's shares.

He invested in several startups, including "Liva Semiconductor", which was sold to Cisco Systems in 2016 for $320 million.

In July 2011, he was listed among the founding investors in Annapurna Labs, responsible for developing server chips for Amazon AWS. Annapurna Labs was sold in 2015 to the American company Amazon for about $370 million.

In 2016, he was the president and the first investor in Lightbits Labs. That same year, together with David Dehan and Ran Halutz, he founded Habana Labs, which develops processors for artificial intelligence applications. He was also the first investor in the company and served as its chairman of the board. In December 2019, the company was sold to the American company Intel for $2 billion. Following this deal, Forbes Israel estimated his wealth at $2.7 billion.

He was philanthropists of organizations such as Breaking the Silence, B'Tselem, Adalah, and Rabbis for Human Rights. As an environmental activist, he contributed to the Society for the Protection of Nature and the Jewish National Fund, an organization dedicated to preserving open spaces in Israel.

== Private life ==
In 2021, Willenz moved to the canton of Bern in Switzerland, where he resides with his partner. His children and grandchildren live in Israel.
