= Host controller interface (USB, Firewire) =

Software interface

A USB and Firewire Host Controller Interface (UFHC) is a register-level interface that enables a host controller for USB or IEEE 1394 hardware to communicate with a host controller driver in software. The driver software is typically provided with an operating system of a personal computer, but may also be implemented by application-specific devices such as a microcontroller.

On the expansion card or motherboard controller, this involves much custom logic, with digital logic engines in the motherboard's controller chip, plus analog circuitry managing the high-speed differential signals. On the software side, it requires a device driver (called a Host Controller Driver, or HCD).

== IEEE 1394 ==
=== Open Host Controller Interface ===
Open Host Controller Interface (OHCI) is an open standard.

Die shot of a VIA VT6307 Integrated Host Controller used for IEEE 1394A communication

When applied to an IEEE 1394 (also known as FireWire; i.LINK or Lynx) card, OHCI means that the card supports a standard interface to the PC and can be used by the OHCI IEEE 1394 drivers that come with all modern operating systems. Because the card has a standard OHCI interface, the OS does not need to know in advance exactly who makes the card or how it works; it can safely assume that the card understands the set of well-defined commands that are defined in the standard protocol.

== USB ==
=== Open Host Controller Interface ===
The OHCI standard for USB is similar to the OHCI standard for IEEE 1394, but supports USB 1.1 (full and low speeds) only; so as a result its register interface looks completely different. Compared with UHCI, it moves more intelligence into the controller, and thus is accordingly much more efficient; this was part of the motivation for defining it. If a computer provides non-x86 USB 1.1, or x86 USB 1.1 from a USB controller that is not made by Intel or VIA, it probably uses OHCI (e.g. OHCI is common on add-in PCI Cards based on an NEC chipset). It has many fewer intellectual property restrictions than UHCI. It only supports 32-bit memory addressing, so it requires an IOMMU or a computationally expensive bounce buffer to work with a 64-bit operating system. OHCI interfaces to the rest of the computer only with memory-mapped I/O.

=== Universal Host Controller Interface ===
Universal Host Controller Interface (UHCI) is a proprietary interface created by Intel for USB 1.x (full and low speeds). It requires a license from Intel. A USB controller using UHCI does little in hardware and requires a software UHCI driver to do much of the work of managing the USB bus. It only supports 32-bit memory addressing, so it requires an IOMMU or a computationally expensive bounce buffer to work with a 64-bit operating system. UHCI is configured with port-mapped I/O and memory-mapped I/O, and also requires memory-mapped I/O for status updates and for data buffers needed to hold data that needs to be sent or data that was received.

=== Enhanced Host Controller Interface ===
The Enhanced Host Controller Interface (EHCI) is a high-speed controller standard applicable to USB 2.0. UHCI- and OHCI-based systems, as existed previously, entailed greater complexity and costs than necessary. Consequently, the USB Implementers Forum (USB-IF) insisted on a public specification for EHCI. Intel hosted EHCI conformance-testing and this helped to prevent the incursion of proprietary features.

Originally a PC providing high-speed ports had two controllers, one handling low- and full-speed devices and the second handling high-speed devices. Typically such a system had EHCI and either OHCI or UHCI drivers. The UHCI driver provides low- and full-speed interfaces for Intel or VIA chipsets' USB host controllers on the motherboard, or for any VIA discrete host controllers attached to the computer's expansion bus. The OHCI driver provides low- and full-speed functions for USB ports of all other motherboard chipset vendors' integrated USB host controllers or discrete host controllers attached to the computer's expansion bus. The EHCI driver provided high-speed functions for USB ports on the motherboard or on the discrete USB controller. More recent hardware routes all ports through an internal "rate-matching" hub (RMH) that converts all traffic involving any directly-connected ports working at full-speed and low-speed between the high-speed traffic presented to the EHCI controller and the full-speed or low-speed traffic that the ports operating at those speeds expect, allowing the EHCI controller to handle these devices.

The EHCI software interface specification defines both 32-bit and 64-bit versions of its data structures, so it does not need a bounce buffer or IOMMU to work with a 64-bit operating system if a rate-matching hub is implemented to provide full-speed and low-speed connectivity instead of companion controllers using either the UHCI specification or OHCI specification, both of which are 32-bit only specifications.

EHCI has added power management features especially USB Selective Suspend.

=== Extensible Host Controller Interface ===
Extensible Host Controller Interface (xHCI) is the newest host controller standard that improves speed, power efficiency and virtualization over its predecessors. The goal was also to define a USB host controller to replace UHCI/OHCI/EHCI. It supports all USB device speeds (USB 3.1 SuperSpeed+, USB 3.0 SuperSpeed, USB 2.0 Low-, Full-, and High-speed, USB 1.1 Low- and Full-speed).

=== Virtual Host Controller Interface ===
Virtual Host Controller Interface (VHCI) refers to a virtual controller that may export virtual USB devices not backed by physical devices. For instance, on Linux, VHCI controllers are used to expose USB devices from other machines, attached using the USB/IP protocol.

=== USB4 Host Interface ===
The USB4 Host Interface defined in the USB4 Specification. It makes operating system to manage USB4 Host Route for USB, DisplayPort, PCI Express, Thunderbolt or Host-to-Host Communication.

== See also ==
- Advanced Host Controller Interface (AHCI)
- Non-Volatile Memory Host Controller Interface (NVMHCI)
- Wireless USB (WHCI 1.0)
- RAID Controller
- Host adapter
- LPCIO
