= Jordan Banks =

Canadian businessman

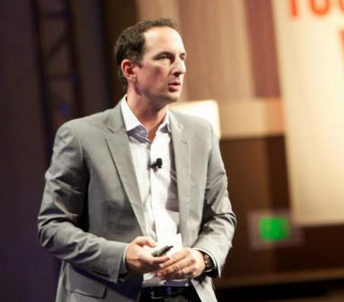
- Jordan Banks presenting on stage (2012)
- Born: 17 May 1968 (age 58); Ottawa, Ontario, Canada
- Education: University of Western Ontario, Osgoode Hall Law School
- Occupations: President, Rogers Media
- Employer: Rogers Communications

Jordan Banks (born May 17, 1968) is a Canadian businessman, who formerly served as President of Rogers Sports & Media until January 14, 2022. Prior to this, he served as VP and Country Director of Facebook and Instagram Canada. Prior to Facebook he was the CEO of JumpTV, a publicly traded online provider of live and on-demand sports and international television that merged with Charles Wang’s Neulion Inc. in 2008. Before JumpTV, Banks served as the Managing Director for eBay Canada, a division that he helped launch in 2000.

In 2012, Banks was named "The Most Influential Innovator in Canada" by the Financial Post. In 2014, Banks was named as one of "Canada's 50 Most Powerful Business People" by Canadian Business.

== Early life ==
Banks was born in Ottawa, Ontario and grew up in Toronto, Ontario. He attended St Andrew’s Junior High School and York Mills Collegiate Institute.

Banks earned his Bachelor of Arts in Political Science at the University of Western Ontario and later received a law degree from Osgoode Hall Law School at York University.

== Career ==
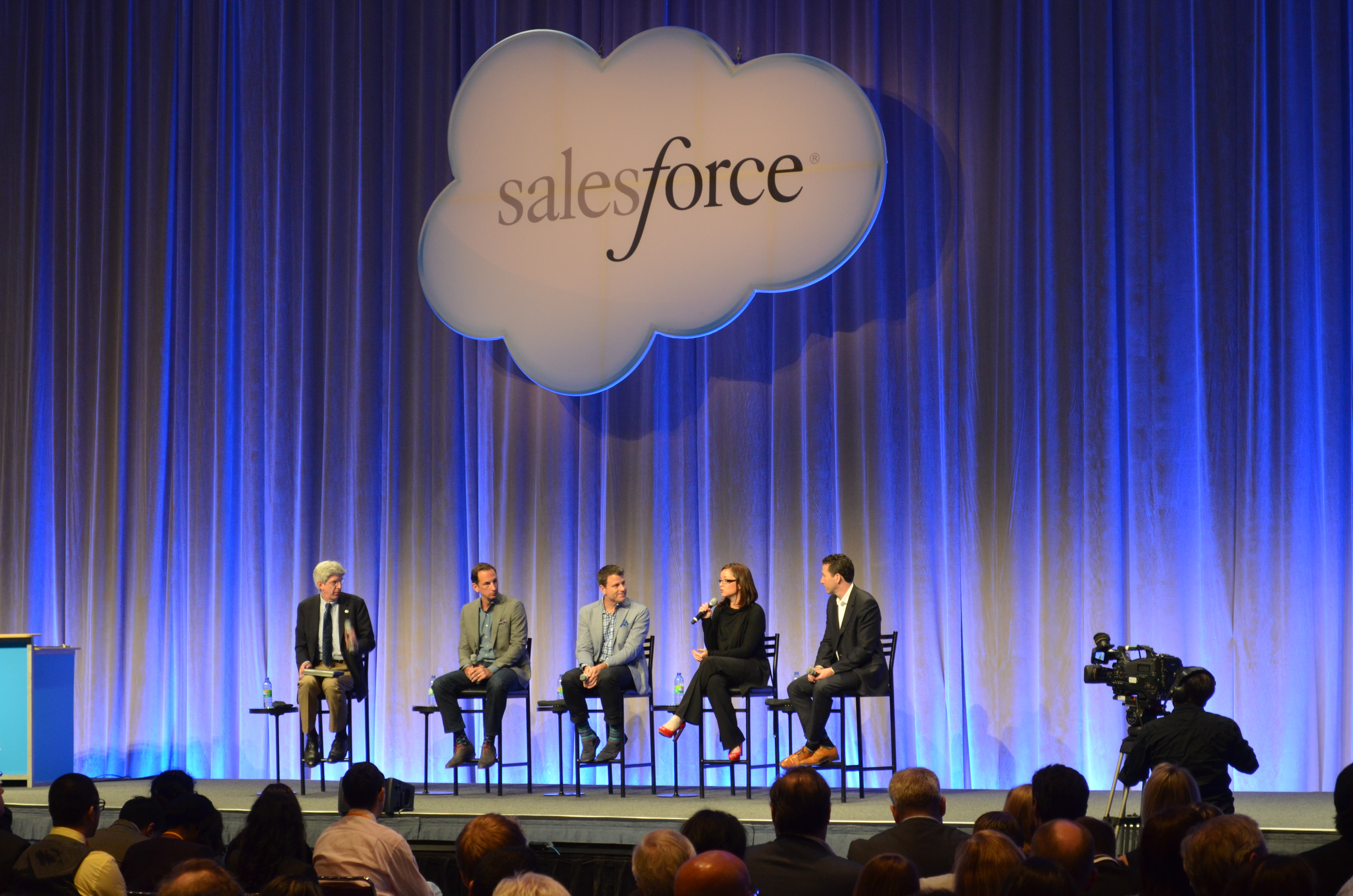
Jordan Banks (second from the left) at a Salesforce event.

In 1994, Banks started his career as a lawyer working for Goodmans, a Toronto-based law firm.

In 1997, he was asked to join the National Hockey League Players' Association where he was an executive in its Licensing and International Business group.

Banks was then hired as the second employee at eBay Canada and helped launched the organization in 2000. In 2005, he was made Managing Director, a position that he retained until his departure in 2007. During his time at eBay, the Canadian division grew to over $1 billion in activity.

In October 2007, Banks assumed the role of CEO of publicly traded JumpTV and helped architect the merger between JumpTV and Charles Wang’s Neulion Inc.

Following his time at JumpTV, Banks co-founded Thunder Road Capital, an investment and advisory firm focused on supporting early-stage technology companies. To date, the firm has made over 50 investments.

Banks was named the Managing Director of Facebook Canada in 2010. As of February 2014, 19 million Canadians log into Facebook every month with more than 14 million doing so everyday (10 million of which log in via mobile). In addition to managing the Canadian operations, Banks was named Global Head of Vertical Strategy in 2013.

Banks was appointed President, Rogers Sports and Media in July 2019.

== Boards and affiliations ==
Banks was the founder of Sportsfest, an annual sporting event that raised more than $1 million for Alzheimer's research and care. He also created the "1 Million Tweets To Remember" Twitter movement as a way to create a digital legacy for those affected by Alzheimer's disease.

Banks furthered his commitment to Alzheimer's research and care by serving on the Board of Directors of The Baycrest Foundation and The Baycrest Centre for Geriatric Care, a research and education hospital with a focus on developing and providing innovations in ageing and brain health. Banks also sat on the Board of Advisors for Tanz Centre for Research in Neurodegenerative Diseases.

Additionally, Banks currently serves on the Board of Directors for Cineplex Entertainment, The Hospital For Sick Children Foundation, The Canadian Children’s Literacy Foundation, and The Black North Initiative.

In 2012, Banks was appointed to the Board of Governors for the University of Waterloo.

Banks is a charter member of the C100, a business mentor to Extreme Startups and special advisor to the Next 36.

== Honors ==
In 2006, Banks was one of four inaugural winners of the Hugo Boss "Leave a Mark Award" celebrating "Men of Excellence" in Canada.

Jordan Banks is a recipient of Canada's "Top 40 Under 40".

In 2012, Jordan was invited to deliver "The Last Lecture" at the University of Western Ontario.

In 2012, the Financial Post selected Jordan as "The Most Influential Innovator In Canada".

In 2014, Canadian Business named Banks one of "The 50 Most Powerful Business People in Canada". That same year, Banks was also named one of Canada's 10 Leading Men by the Weizmann Institute of Science celebrating individuals linked by their commitment to philanthropic endeavours and an understanding of the importance of scientific research and the impact it can have on the world.
