= DivX (disambiguation) =

DivX may refer to:

- DivX, a video codec from DivX, Inc.
- DIVX, the failed pay-per-view for DVD
- DivX, Inc., the company that offers software for encoding in DivX and that certifies devices that are capable or encoding and/or playing DivX encoded video
