= VReel =

Short-lived video sharing website

- Screenshot of VReel.net as of August 2009
- Website type: Video sharing
- Available in: English
- Dissolved: January 25, 2010
- Owner: Eoghan Hayes
- Creator: VReel Media
- Website: http://vreel.net/
- Commercial: Yes
- Registration: Optional.(required to upload, rate, and comment on videos)
- Launched: May 31, 2008
- Current status: Closed

VReel was a video sharing web site that allowed users to upload, share and view high resolution videos by use of a proprietary video codec. The site was in open beta in an effort to replace the now defunct Stage6 site with a viable alternative. Using a similar style to Stage6, VReel also received a licence from DivX, Inc. to use their video codec, and signed an agreement with Edgecast to distribute the web site globally.

== Early development ==
VReel began in 2008 under the title DivXIt.net, drawing attention from the Internet community by means of social bookmarking web sites, such as Digg. DivXIt.net's inbound traffic gained the attention of DivX, Inc., who immediately issued a cease and desist order against the web site for trademark infringement. Following this event, DivXIt staff responded to the order offering to sign the domain name over to DivX, Inc. in return for a free licence for the web site. This arrangement was met and the site renamed itself VReel, and the DivXIt.net domain was transferred to DivX, Inc.

Having moved to a new domain (VReel.net), a short time later VReel was contacted by Limelight Networks, and was offered a hosting plan on their network.

The original beta test of VReel.net was scheduled to begin on 18 May 2008, with the full release occurring at the 31st of the same month.

However, on May 23, VReel released a statement stating that its programming team was late in releasing the beta version of the site, and that as of that date, their contract legally allowed for 2 more days to deliver the beta release. This did not occur however, and the site's lead developer started an arbitration process. The May 23rd statement also stated that a new development team was to be selected "in the next 5 days", a period which would end on May 27.

VReel servers went down on Saturday 31 May 2008 due to a fire at The Planet data center. The site recovered on Wednesday 4 June 2008.

=== Downtime ===
On August 3, 2008, VReel disabled all video playback. This was due to multiple "leech sites" stealing bandwidth and causing high operating costs that were needed to fund the development and launch of the second beta.

VReel announced that the web site would be back online by August 30, 2008. Financial problems forced the company to postpone.

== Relaunch ==
Alexa

In October 2008, VReel announced a partnership with Lavasoft. Eoghan stated "VReel.net, the home of high definition and high speed online video has today announced its software partnership with Lavasoft, for their highly acclaimed and award winning Ad-Aware anti-spyware software.

VReel Beta 2 introduced several new features, including expanded community features and premium accounts.

=== Closed beta ===
On November 10th, VReel enabled private access to its second beta. They introduced beta testers in waves, and applications were available for users to apply. The second wave began on November 14, and finally the third Began on the 21st. During the closed beta period there were free keys given to those who won "Treasure Hunts" that Eoin made.

=== Open beta ===
VReel announced a 24-hour trial period during which the site would be openly accessible to the public. Following the 24-hour trial on 28 November, the site remained open indefinitely.

VReel acquired the StageHD.com domain, and forwarded all traffic to the VReel video portal.

VReel's traffic share continued to rise since its launch. The site was taking in more than 500,000 unique hits per day and continued to rise.

In July 2009, the site was ranked #30,500 by Alexa. By October 2009, the site had risen to rank #16,824.

=== Hosting and distribution ===
May 5, 2009, the site announced that in addition to its original partnership with EdgeCast Networks, it is now also directly peering with various ISPs, including Level-3 and AT&T. The announcement also stated the site's backend was moved to a new set of servers. It was previously hosted on 3 servers in Germany and moved to 10 servers in the United States.

=== VReel-Player ===
VReel has been working on their own webplayer, based on the VLC media player, to replace the DivX Web Player. With the new web player, VReel would natively support 4 formats. The VReel Player has not yet been released to the public.

The May 2009 announcement stated that contrary to previous announcements, the VReel Player will not be based on the VLC player and neither will it be open source. After the project has been put on hold it has now been continued and will be (re)built from the ground up in closed source. Among concerns, the primary concern for going closed-source (instead of open-source) was the confrontation with too many security issues when having the source open for everyone. The VReel Player would be redeveloped under a closed source license, and will be fully capable of DivX, XviD and h.264 playback.

== Shutdown ==
As of January 24th 2010, We have decided to take the decision to close VReel as a user-generated HD DivX Video portal. VReel was created as a replacement for DivX's popular Stage6 platform - but due to its popularity, became impossible to financially sustain in a time of increasing development costs, and plummeting advertisement and revenue sources. Following a mass hardware failure at our main server farm, we have decided not to relaunch VReel in its current environment.

VReel is currently being redeveloped as a HD Video search engine, with several great features not yet seen in the search engine marketplace. We hope to have this launched within April 2010.

Our forums will remain open for discussion, where we'll be unveiling a string of new projects from VReel's founding team.

We'd like to thank everyone who contributed to VReel over the past two years - it's been an amazing experience.

— VReel Team, Frontpage announcement
