= MainActor =

Video editing software

MainActor was video editing software from MainConcept for Windows also for Linux. The last version was 5.5, being available for SuSE 10.1 and Ubuntu 6 distributions. In the beginning the software was written on the Amiga.

The software cost EUR€167.23 (US$199.00). A free demo version, that shows a watermark, was available.

MainActor was created and developed by Markus Moenig, the CEO of MainConcept at that time.

In May 2007, MainConcept decided to discontinue the supply and development of MainActor. In November 2007, MainConcept was taken over by DivX, Inc. The software is no longer officially available or supported.

== See also ==
- Comparison of video editing software
- List of video editing software
- Markus Moenig
