= Stage6 =

Video sharing website

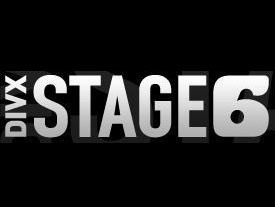

- Screenshot of the previous Stage6.com home page
- Website type: Video sharing
- Available in: English
- Owner: DivX, Inc.
- Creators: DivX, Inc.
- Website: stage6.com
- Commercial: Yes
- Registration: Free
- Launched: 2006
- Current status: Offline

Stage6 was a video sharing website owned and operated by DivX, Inc., where users could upload, share, and view video clips. Stage6 was different from other video services in that it streamed high quality video clips that were user-encoded with DivX and Xvid video codecs.

The website never went beyond beta status, and was shut down by DivX Inc. on February 29, 2008 because of apparent inability to support Stage6 financially, or other officially unspecified reasons.

In June 2008, CNET hailed Stage6 as one of the greatest defunct websites in history.

== History ==
=== Launch and growth ===
First launched in 2006 by DivX, Inc. and in public beta, Stage6 was similar to other video sharing sites like YouTube in allowing streaming video to be uploaded freely by anyone willing to register.

On July 24, 2007, DivX, Inc. announced that it would be seeking to separate Stage6 as a company from the rest of DivX, Inc. Co-founder and Executive Chairman Jordan Greenhall would be switching from his current role as CEO to manage the separating Stage6, which, if successful, was expected to be completed later in 2007.

By January 2008, Stage6 had a total of 10.7 million views.

=== Hacking ===
At approximately 16:00 GMT on February 9, 2008, Stage6 was hacked. People that visited the front page of the website were redirected to multiple shock sites. Several thousand user accounts that were used to upload videos between December 7, 2007 and February 10, 2008, are thought to have been compromised by the attack Approximately two and a half hours later, a site maintenance notice was put up by the Stage6 team.

Service to the site was restored at approximately 11:30 GMT on February 10, 2008. The upload and publishing functions were disabled after the attack, and restored on February 14, 2008. The motive for the attack and extent of damage remain unclear to this day.

=== Shutdown ===
On February 25, 2008, DivX announced that they would shut down Stage6 on February 28, 2008, stating that they were unable to continue to provide the attention and resources required for its continued operation. A day later than stated, Stage6 ceased to operate, directing users to a Veoh welcome page designed specifically for the purpose of receiving the Stage6 community.

On March 11, 2008, DivX Inc. disclosed "significant costs" and "potential copyright litigation" as the primary considerations leading to the shutdown of Stage6.

On February 25, 2008, LiveUniverse Inc. offered to acquire Stage6 prior to the site being shut down by DivX. The offer consisted of 3 million USD lump sum, US$5 million in online advertising credits for DivX to use on their sites and a 10% equity stake in the new entity. If, after three years, DivX should decide to cash out its stake, LiveUniverse would pay a minimum of US$3 million for it. The net payment would total to US$11 million. However, after LiveUniverse made its first offer, DivX Board refused to engage in any direct dialogue for over five days, during which it shut down Stage6.

According to the web-news blog TechCrunch, the prime reason for the shutdown was not the Stage6-generated bandwidth costs (approx. US$1 million per month), but an internal conflict on the DivX, Inc. board. The site states that DivX, Inc. would have been close to breaking even solely with the income from the Yahoo Toolbar (approx. US$8 million per year), distributed with DivX Web Player, and gain extra profits from other deals with their investors. The reason for the decline of the deal is described by TechCrunch as a "Serious Drama, And Lots of Stupidity".

== Usage ==
Stage6 accepted a wide variety of video content, including TV clips and trailers, music videos, feature-length television episodes and films, as well as amateur content such as video-blogging, original videos and amateur films. Unregistered users could view and download to hard-drive all videos on the site, except those containing potentially offensive content.

The users who went through the free registration had access to additional features. These included:

- "18+" videos. These usually containing pornography or other sexual content, excessive blood and gore or obscenity. Stage6 did not censor offensive content.
- Rating. The users had the ability to either rate the video as "good", by clicking on the "thumb up"-button, or respectively "bad", by clicking the "thumb down"-button. After a significant number of hits, the site then rated the video's popularity on its search or front pages, by either displaying up to five "thumbs up" or "thumbs down" respectively. The videos with higher rating were then displayed higher in the search results.
- Comments. The users had an opportunity to add a comment, placed below the video.
- Tagging. The registered users were able to place and suggest the removal of tags to each video. These were then used to power the inbuilt search engine.

Stage6 also featured its own search engine profiling the videos by the user-generated tags and their popularity. Because the search engine used the tags, rather than the title, as a primary search criteria, it was often difficult to find a video based on its name.

Significant differences between Stage6 and other sites included better quality video through use of higher resolutions up to 1080p, few upload limitations, the option to download media directly through the website or the DivX Web Player, however this feature has been removed in the update, without the need to install browser extensions, and the use of DivX video codec instead of Flash Video. Unlike most video sharing websites, Stage6 required the installation of the DivX Web Player to view videos. The DivX Content Uploader is also bundled with the DivX Web Player, enabling users to upload Stage6 compliant videos via web browser.

== Technical ==
Stage6 accepted DivX or Xvid encoded files up to 1080p60. Stage6 rejected encoded videos not mixed with MP2 or MP3 audio. Upload file size limit for an individual video was 2 Gigabytes. The download speeds from Stage6 ranged up to and above 16 Mbit/s.

The video playback was based on the DivX codec and required the user to download and install a web browser plug-in in order to view video. Since the DivX Web Player was designed specifically for viewing videos, streamed on extremely high quality, high resolution videos were made possible under comparatively low CPU usage.

Downloaded videos could also be played-back with third-party media players such as Windows Media Player, if an MPEG-4 decoder is installed on the computer, or with media players such as VLC Media Player or MPlayer with appropriate web plugins. Certain downloaded videos could also be played on a PlayStation 3 or Xbox 360 with current firmware by renaming the extension .divx from the downloaded file to .avi.

== Copyright issues ==
Stage6 did not permit the upload of copyrighted content without the original author's permission, and a large volume of content was deleted for breaching these terms. Despite this a large amount of copyrighted content continued to be uploaded, with television shows, feature films and music videos routinely hotlinked to Stage6 by third parties offering television or film downloads. The most famous of these hotlinking sites that categorized Stage6 content was Joox.

In December 2006, Universal Music Group (UMG) sent a cease and desist letter to DivX, Inc., notifying them that several of their videos had appeared on Stage6. DivX removed the videos in question but were reapproached several months later by UMG who proposed a licensing agreement and suggested DivX pay $30 million for "past infringements". Anticipating legal action, DivX filed a preemptive lawsuit against UMG on September 6, 2007, asking for a declaratory ruling to affirm Stage6's legality under DMCA safe harbor provisions. Six weeks later, UMG filed a copyright infringement lawsuit against DivX, arguing that their trial was the appropriate venue for DivX's question to be answered. On February 5, 2008, UMG's request was upheld.

== See also ==
- Comparison of video services
- VReel
