= Joox (video streaming) =

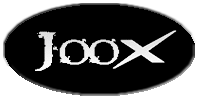
- Website type: Online video video directory
- Owner: Private
- Creators: Christoffer Bubach, Founder
- Website: www.joox.net
- Registration: Not required for most services
- Launched: April 2007
- Current status: Inactive

Joox was a video link site that allowed users to find online video content. Created in 2007 and shut down in early 2022, it was the world's first popular website that streamed divX material from the host and provider Stage6. A relatively small number of streaming video sites were known when Joox first launched, and none used the divX format. It had no problem getting a wide user base because of the superior video quality and ease of use.

Videos were submitted by users and put into selected categories based on moderator review. To watch a video, the user needed to install the DivX web player or VLC web browser plugin. Python/Spyce scripts could also be linked to the Joox database for browsing and playback in such applications as XBMC.

== Decline ==
With the demise of Stage6, Joox's survival depended on finding other video hosts, which meant a format shift from DivX to flash video was introduced. This subsequent decline in quality, as well as the reduced number of movies and shows, and increasing server problems based on heavy site traffic led many to believe that the site would soon die.

Eventually the legal threats and struggle to keep up with video hosts all with more effective ways to lock "link-thieves" (such as Joox) out, made Joox abandon video streaming and change focus to a more IMDb look and feel. The site is no longer in operation, and currently redirects to Movopia.com.
