= GEJ =

GEJ may refer to:

- Gen language
- Gimnasia y Esgrima de Jujuy, an Argentine sports club
- Goodluck Jonathan (born 1957), former President of Nigeria
- Jérôme Rota (born 1973), French software developer
