= Markus Moenig =

German Entrepreneur and Computer scientist

- Markus Mönig
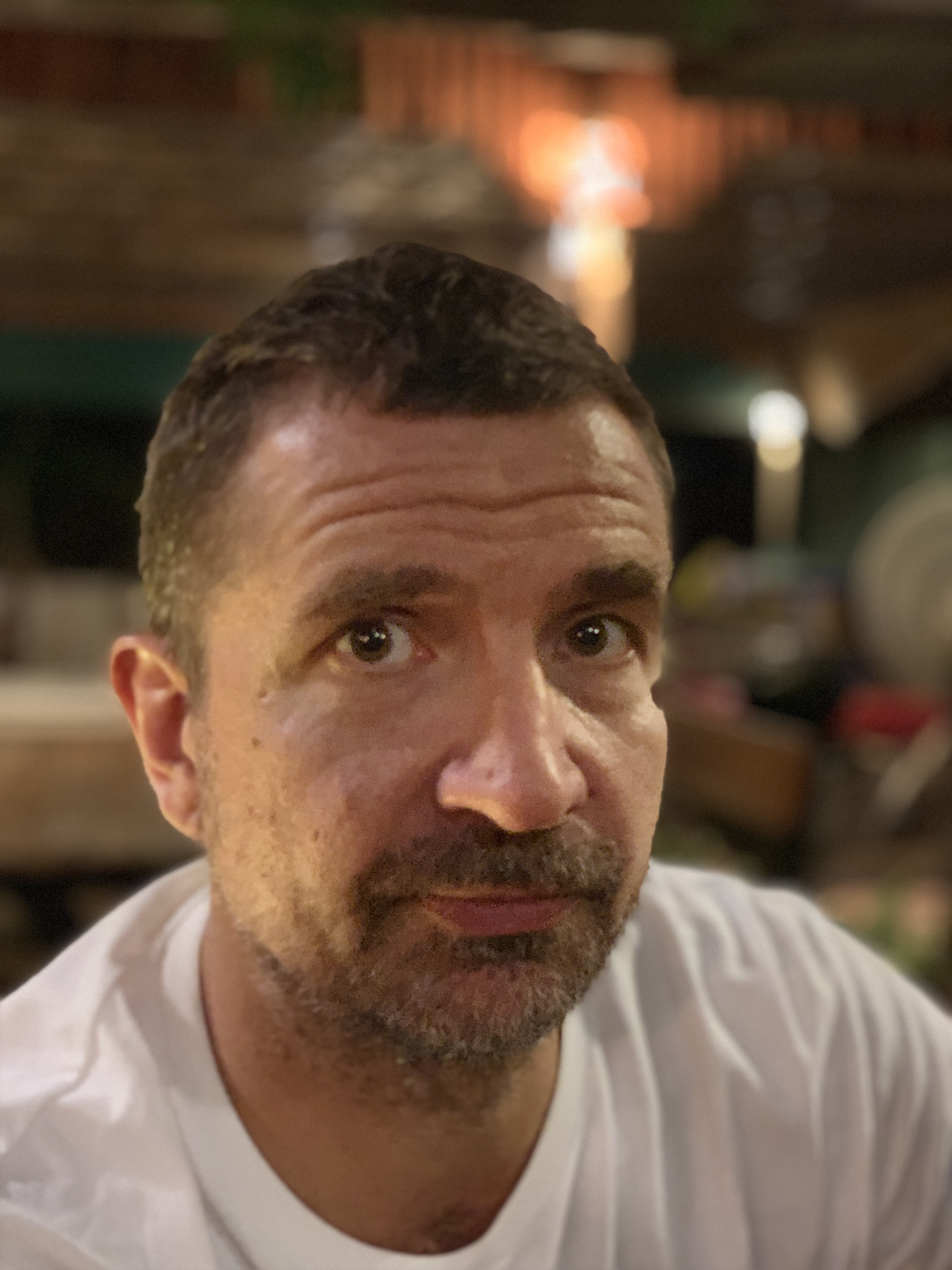
- Markus Moenig in 2018
- Occupations: Entrepreneur, Computer scientist
- Known for: CEO of BrainDistrict GmbH and MainConcept

Markus Moenig (German: Markus Mönig), is a German Entrepreneur and Computer scientist. He is the CEO of BrainDistrict GmbH, a Graphics software manufacturing company. He was the founder of MainConcept, a video/audio codecs developing company which was acquired by DivX, Inc. in 2007.

== Biography ==
Markus started early by developing IP Video codecs. In 1993, during his student days he and Thomas Zabel founded MainConcept company to become a dominant provider of video/audio codecs. The company earned recognition by developing award winning video codecs which were licensed and integrated in products of many companies including Adobe. MainConcept was acquired by DivX, Inc. in November 2007 for US$22 Million. At the same time Markus joined DivX and soon after became Senior Vice President and CTO in February 2008. During his term, his focus was to integrate H.264 digital video technology into the DivX product line. The technology was later implemented into DivX 7 and released in January 2009. Markus resigned from DivX shortly after in December 2008 in order to find entrepreneurial opportunities in his own country. In 2009, Markus founded BrainDistrict GmbH, a 3d graphics software manufacturing company. He is now retired, living in Thailand and creates open source graphic applications.

== See also ==
- MainActor
