= DivX Plus HD =

DivX Plus HD, launched in 2009, is the brand name for the file type that DivX, Inc. has chosen for their high definition video format. DivX Plus HD files consist of high definition H.264/MPEG-4 AVC video with surround sound Advanced Audio Coding (AAC) audio, wrapped up in the open-standard Matroska container, identified by the .mkv file extension. DivX Plus HD files leverage and extend on Matroska's ability to support multiple language tracks, subtitles, chapters, and additional bonus content.

== DivX Plus HD products ==
=== Software ===
As of the release of DivX 7, DivX Plus HD support has been included in the main software bundle.

On 16 March 2010, DivX released DivX Plus Software (version 8) for Windows which included:

- DivX Plus Player – Play DivX 6 files (.avi and .divx with MP3 audio) and DivX Plus HD (.mkv with AAC audio)
  - DivX to Go – A device transfer wizard for moving videos to DivX devices via USB or optical disc
- DivX Plus Converter – Creates .mkv files via the "DivX Plus HD" menu or converts .mkv to .divx
- DivX Plus Web Player – Plays .mkv files with H.264 video and AAC audio on web pages inside a web browser.
- DivX Plus Codec Pack – DirectShow components for decoding and creating DivX and DivX Plus video files
  - DXVA for H.264 video – Optional hardware acceleration components for H.264 video on supported graphics cards
  - DivX Plus Tech Preview: MKV on Windows 7 – An MKV-playback component for Windows 7 that leverages Microsoft Media Foundation framework

As of April 17, 2025, the latest version of DivX Software is 11.12, released for both Windows and macOS platforms.

== DivX Plus HD Profile ==
DivX has defined profiles which are subsets of MPEG-4/AVI and H264/MKV standards. Because the grouping is a specific subset of what is in the standards, there are certification processes for each of the profiles that device manufacturers must follow. Below is the DivX Plus HD profile.

All DivX Plus HD certified devices bearing a DivX Plus logo will adhere to the profile outlined in the table below, as would any tools that support the DivX profiles. DivX Plus HD devices are also tested for compliance against the DivX HD 1080p profile for MPEG4/AVI certification in order to maintain backwards compatibility

Profile	+HD 1080p
Codec	MPEG4 part 10 (H.264)
File Extension(s)	.mkv
Max. resolution (px×px×Hz)	1920×1080×30, 1280×720×60
Max VBV bitrate (bit/s)	VCL: 20000000, NAL: 24000000
Min. VBV buffer size (KiB)	VCL: 3200, NAL: 3840
Macroblocks (per second)	244800
Subtitles	8×SRT
Audio	8×MP3, AC3, AAC

== MKV Extensions ==
DivX has introduced additional features beyond the Matroska specification that are implemented during the video file creation process and exposed during playback in DivX Plus software and on consumer electronics devices certified for DivX Plus HD. Below are the standard and extended MKV features that are specific to the DivX Plus HD profile.

=== World Fonts ===
Currently, font files can be easily attached to .mkv files using a Matroska mux, but certain problems may arise when attempting to utilize a font during playback. Usually, performance is affected because the font file can be large and take time to load for the subtitles. The DivX Plus Word Fonts extension attempts to solve this problem by optimizing the font file during the file creation stage. A DivX Plus mux, like the DivXMKVMux, can examine the subtitle file, determine which characters are required from a font file, and repack the font file for attachment with only the necessary symbols, thereby reducing the font attachment size and decreasing the time it needs to load.

=== Smooth FF/RW ===
DivX has released a specification for a DivX Plus extension that aims to improve seeking quickly through a video file, either forward or backward. Called Smooth FF/RW, the creator of the video creates a lower resolution version of the video that is attached to the .mkv file and leveraged whenever a user instructs their player to seek fast forward or rewind. When the user presses fast forward or rewind, the full resolution track is swapped out with the lower resolution version, requiring less resources; when the user presses play, the lower resolution track is instantly swapped out to the full resolution version, which is intended to solve inaccurate seeking issues or a stuttering effect during fast forward and rewind.

=== Multi-title Play ===
Episodic content can be packaged into a single file.

=== Authored and Auto-generated Chapters ===
Access to chapter points in a video when no chapter information exists.

=== Quick Start ===
The format supports quick start where the user can begin viewing even large HD files immediately.

== Hardware ==
The following chips have been certified or have licensing agreements for DivX Plus HD:

IC Provider	Model Number	Date Certified	Type	Notes
Broadcom	BCM3556	7 September 2010	DTV	
Broadcom	BCM3549	27 August 2010	DTV	
Mediatek	MT8550TBAG	23 August 2010	Blu-ray Disc player	
Mediatek	MT8550UBAG	23 August 2010	Blu-ray Disc player	
Mediatek	MT8555DGBG	8 July 2010	Blu-ray Disc player	
Mediatek	MT8555DIBG	8 July 2010	Blu-ray Disc player	
Mediatek	MT8555DJBG	8 July 2010	Blu-ray Disc player	
Mediatek	MT8555DHBG	8 July 2010	Blu-ray Disc player	
Mediatek	OP8531	6 July 2010	Blu-ray Disc player	
Mediatek	MT8653ACEG	17 June 2010	Blu-ray Disc player	
Mediatek	MT8652ACEG	8 June 2010	Blu-ray Disc player	
Mediatek	MT8555DDBG	3 June 2010	Blu-ray Disc player	
Mediatek	MT8555DCBG	3 June 2010	Blu-ray Disc player	
Mediatek	MT8555DEBG	3 June 2010	Blu-ray Disc player	
Mediatek	MT8555DFBG	27 May 2010	Blu-ray Disc player	
Mediatek	MT8550JBAG	17 May 2010	Blu-ray Disc player	
Mediatek	MT8530PEFG	24 March 2010	Blu-ray Disc player	MT8530 announced as first DivX Plus HD certified chip.
Mediatek	MT8530MEFG	24 March 2010	Blu-ray Disc player	
Mediatek	MT8530KEFG	5 November 2009	Blu-ray Disc player	
Mediatek	MT8530JEFG	5 November 2009	Blu-ray Disc player	
Mediatek	MT8530AEFG	30 September 2009	Blu-ray Disc player	
Panasonic	MN2WS0150D3	16 August 2010	Blu-ray Disc player	UniPhier chips named in licensing agreement.
Panasonic	MN2WS0150D2	16 August 2010	Blu-ray Disc player	UniPhier chips named in licensing agreement.
Panasonic	MN2WS0140DFF1	10 June 2010	Blu-ray Disc player	UniPhier chips named in licensing agreement.
Panasonic	MN2WS0141DFF	11 May 2010	Blu-ray Disc player	UniPhier chips named in licensing agreement.
Realtek	RTD1073	24 March 2010	Digital multimedia processor	
Realtek	RTD1283	3 March 2010	Digital multimedia processor	

NEC Electronics has signed a multi-year licensing agreement to include DivX Plus HD in its EMMA chips.

=== Consumer electronics ===
The following products have been DivX Plus HD Certified:

OEM / ODM	Model Number	Date Certified	Type	Notes
Denon	DBP-1611UD	5 October 2010	Blu-ray Disc player	
Marantz	UD5005	12 October 2010	Blu-ray Disc player	
Panasonic	DMP-BDT100EE	31 August 2010	Blu-ray Disc player	
Panasonic	SC-BTT755EGK	27 July 2010	Blu-ray Disc player	
Panasonic	SC-BFT800EBK	15 July 2010	Blu-ray Disc player	
Panasonic	SC-BFT800EGK	15 July 2010	Blu-ray Disc player	
Panasonic	SC-BFT800GNK	15 July 2010	Blu-ray Disc player	
Panasonic	SC-BTT350EGK	14 July 2010	Blu-ray Disc player	
Panasonic	SC-BTT755EBK	14 July 2010	Blu-ray Disc player	
Panasonic	SC-BTT350EBK	14 July 2010	Blu-ray Disc player	
Panasonic	SC-BTT350GNK	14 July 2010	Blu-ray Disc player	
Panasonic	SC-BTT755GNK	14 July 2010	Blu-ray Disc player	
Panasonic	DMP-BDT100GN	22 June 2010	Blu-ray Disc player	
Panasonic	DMP-BDT300EG	26 April 2010	Blu-ray Disc player	The DMP-BDT300 has been DivX Plus HD Certified, and is Panasonic's first FullHD 3D Blu-ray Disc player.
Panasonic	DMP-BDT300GN	26 April 2010	Blu-ray Disc player	The DMP-BDT300 has been DivX Plus HD Certified, and is Panasonic's first FullHD 3D Blu-ray Disc player.
Panasonic	DMP-BDT300EE	26 April 2010	Blu-ray Disc player	The DMP-BDT300 has been DivX Plus HD Certified, and is Panasonic's first FullHD 3D Blu-ray Disc player.
Philips	BDP5180	7 September 2010	Blu-ray Disc player	
Philips	BDP8000	31 August 2010	Blu-ray Disc player	
Philips	BDP7500B2	25 March 2010	Blu-ray Disc player	
Philips	BDP7500S2	3 March 2010	Blu-ray Disc player	
Philips	BDP7500 MK II	5 February 2010	Blu-ray Disc player	
Philips	BDP8000	5 February 2010	Blu-ray Disc player	
Philips	BDP5100	5 February 2010	Blu-ray Disc player	
Soniq	QPB302B	2 June 2010	Blu-ray Disc player	
Seagate	FreeAgent GoFlex TV	2 September 2010	Digital media receiver	
Yamaha	BD-S1067	31 August 2010	Blu-ray Disc player	

== x264 compatibility ==
According to documentation provided by DivX on their DivX Developer Portal, it is possible to make DivX Plus HD compatible files via other H.264 encoders, such as the open source x264 encoder. At minimum, the following command line creates an H.264 bitstream within the DivX Plus HD profile:

x264 --vbv-maxrate=20000 --vbv-bufsize=25000 --level 40 --bframes 3 --keyint <4*FPS> -o <output file> <input file>

Despite the popular transcoding tool HandBrake dropping .avi container support, it can still be used to create DivX Plus compatible videos if MKV is selected for format, x264 is selected for video codec, AAC is used for audio codec, and the following options are passed into the advanced settings:

level=40:ref=2:bframes=2:subq=6:mixed-refs=0:weightb=0:8x8dct=0:trellis=0:vbv-maxrate=20000:vbv-bufsize=25000:weightp=0

== See also ==
- Comparison of container formats
