= JumpTV =

JumpTV Inc.
- Company type: Subsidiary of NeuLion
- Industry: Ethnic online television
- Founded: 2000
- Defunct: 2008
- Headquarters: Toronto, Ontario, Canada
- Key people: G. Scott Paterson
- Number of employees: 66
- Website: www.jumptv.com

JumpTV Inc. was a Canadian company, and one of the country's largest internet television carriers until its acquisition by NeuLion in 2008.

== History ==
JumpTV was formed as an internet television company in 2000. It was limited in the services it could retransmit, namely foreign third-language services for which it has secured the necessary web rights. In June 2005, JumpTV had about 30 TV stations online, a staff of 5 which included Farrel Miller (CEO and Founder), Dan O'Hara (CTO), and Mizan Chowdhury (Technical Support Manager). Chairman G. Scott Paterson raised venture capital and started investing in upgrading the infrastructure.

In August 2006, the Toronto Stock Exchange granted JumpTV's application for the original listing in the Industrial category of 42,902,092 common shares. In February 2007, JumpTV announced a US$100 million Common Share Offering of 13,043,479 common shares.

JumpTV had offices in the United States, Canada, London, Singapore, Colombia and Dubai. At its peak the company provided content from more than 300 television and radio broadcasters from over 70 countries, with the channels being available on the JumpTV CDN. JumpTV only supported the Microsoft Windows Media format, and also had no official Macintosh support though some users were able to connect and view programming through Flip4Mac and QuickTime in Mac OS X.

JumpTV merged with NeuLion Inc in June 2008. Founded in 2004, NeuLion Inc provides web-based IPTV services to sports customers such as the National Hockey League and the International Fight League. Charles Wang, the founder and former CEO of Computer Associates and owner of the New York Islanders, was named Chairman of the merged company while Paterson was appointed its Executive Vice-Chairman. Charles Wang's wife, Nancy Li, was appointed CEO as well as a Director.

== Sports sites ==
JumpTV had a division based in Sanford, Florida, USA which hosted the official websites of a number of professional and college sports organizations. Among them were the Arena Football League, the University of Colorado, Arkansas State University and Ohio State University. These websites also provided for live video and audio coverage.
