= G. Scott Paterson =

Canadian venture capitalist

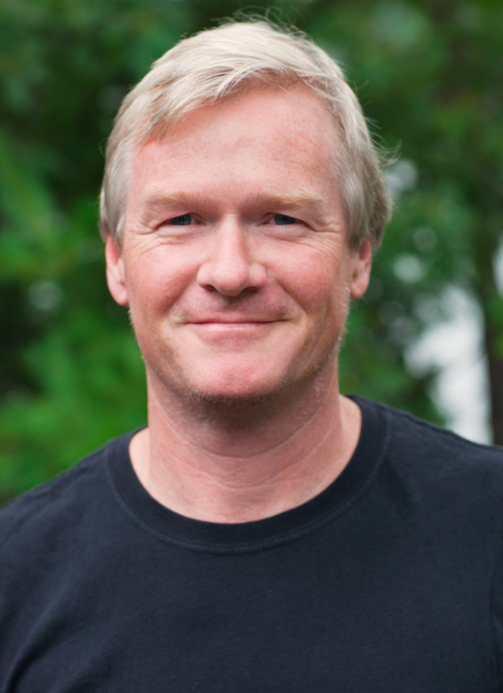
- Paterson in Muskoka, Canada
- Born: January 11, 1964 (age 62); Sarnia, Ontario, Canada
- Education: Institute of Corporate Directors; University of Western Ontario (B.A. economics), Ridley College
- Occupations: Technology and media venture capitalist

Gordon Scott Paterson (born January 11, 1964), better known as G. Scott Paterson, is a Toronto-based technology and media venture capitalist. In the 1990s, Paterson became well-known in the Canadian investment and finance world and served as "a prominent technology and media financier" during the technology boom in the latter half of the decade. Paterson has been the recipient of The Globe and Mail's "Top 40 Under 40 Award" and, in 2007, was recognized by Newsweek magazine as one of the 17 people in its "Who’s Next in 2007" article. An active philanthropist, Paterson co-founded Toronto's Merry Go Round Children's Foundation in 1997 and currently serves as its chairman. Today, Paterson's business efforts are devoted between leadership roles at Engagement Labs Inc. and Lions Gate Entertainment Corporation.

== Early life and education ==
G. Scott Paterson was raised in Ontario by a single mother who worked as a teacher at Lakeport High School. As a child, Paterson was sparked with an early interest in the stock market when his grandmother one day bought him five shares of Abitibi Paper. As Paterson once recalled, "Most of my friends got new bikes for their birthday and, instead, I received a share certificate".

Paterson got his first job at age nine, which was selling programs at Merrittville Speedway in St. Catharines and Ransomville Speedway. By age twelve, Paterson was writing articles for the programs at Merrittsville and Ransomville Speedways, and by age fifteen, Paterson served as the Assistant Track Announcer for both locations.

Paterson attended Sir Winston Churchill Secondary School. He attended Ridley College for grades 12 and 13 with the assistance of school bursaries. Paterson then went on to attend the University of Western Ontario, where he first earned a Bachelor of Arts degree in economics in 1985, followed by a completion of the university's Executive Program in 1995. Paterson completed his Canadian Securities Course in 1984 and the Canadian securities industry officers and directors designations in 1991. In 1996, Paterson obtained the US Series 7 and Series 24 accreditations, entitling him to sell securities in the United States and to be an officer and director of a United States broker dealer.

In 2009, Paterson earned his ICD.d designation after completing the program offered at the Institute of Corporate Directors sponsored by the University of Toronto’s Rotman School of Management, " and earned a Certificate of Entertainment Law at Osgoode Hall, York University in 2014.

== Career ==
=== Start in the investment industry ===
After graduating from university in 1985, Paterson began in the retail brokerage side of the investment world. Starting out as a retail broker at Dominion Securities Pitfield, Paterson became known as the 'cold-call cowboy' and became head of the firm's President's Club, as well as its top broker of those in their first three years in the industry, as measured by commissions earned.

After being recruited by the Richardson Greenshields firm in 1987, Paterson landed a position as a senior investment banker at Midland Walwyn Inc, a newly formed brokerage company. It was at Midland, where Paterson began to focus his attention as an investor on the technology industry. Paterson was considered the "IPO King" at Midland, and was considered for the role of head of investment banking when late in 1994, Midland Walwyn President Peter Wallace and his allies attempted to gain control of the company and unseat then chief executive officer, Bob Schultz. This failed and Wallace and others were fired. Veteran banker Bob McLeish was given the head of investment banking role and Paterson began to look for an alternative venue to build a tech-focused boutique brokerage firm.

=== Yorkton Securities Inc. ===
In 1995, Paterson was recruited again, this time by Yorkton Securities Inc., a small, independent, mining-focused brokerage house. In his six years at Yorkton, Paterson helped transform the brokerage from a mining firm to a knowledge industries firm that targeted technology, internet, film and television, and biotechnology as their industries of focus. Paterson also helped build out Yorkton's retail presence to $3 billion in assets and helped take total firm revenue to $244 million in 2001, with a pre-tax profit of $56 million. Paterson was promoted at the company and, in October 1998, at the age of 34, Paterson became Yorkton's chairman and chief executive officer. Paterson served as chairman of Yorkton from 1998 until December 2001. As chairman, Paterson pulled the company into "tech stocks just in time for the Silicon Valley gold rush of the late '90s".

==== Controversy at Yorkton Securities ====
In March 2000, the Vancouver Sun reported that Yorkton had played multiple roles as investor, promoter and underwriter of a tech start-up known as Book4Golf.com Corp. This action raised questions about conflicts of interest for the firm and in December 2001, Paterson left Yorkton Securities. This incident was considered to be the reason for Paterson's departure.

In relation to the Book4Golf.com incident Paterson reached a settlement agreement with the Ontario Securities Commission for investor conduct that the commission believed was against public interest. As part of the agreement, Paterson was asked to pay $1.1 million Canadian dollars to the commission and was barred from trading for six months. This settlement came despite the OSC stating Paterson never breached any securities laws. The OSC head of enforcement Michael Watson said "the information before the commission on which Paterson settled did not involve the breach of securities law. Paterson was not involved with insider trading." Paterson fulfilled all parts of the settlement agreement.

==== Current career interests ====
Paterson currently divides his time between leadership roles at Engagement Labs Inc. and Lions Gate Entertainment Corporation.

===== Lions Gate Entertainment =====
Paterson also serves on the board of directors at Lions Gate Entertainment, functioning as chairman of the audit committee for the board. Lionsgate is a major motion picture production and distribution company with widely known production features such as Mad Men, Orange Is the New Black and The Hunger Games franchise on its roster.

===== Engagement Labs Inc. =====
Engagement Labs Inc. is a data and analytics firm. Their main product is called "TotalSocial", a tool that combines online and offline data with predictive analytics. Since January 2014 Paterson serves as the chairman for the company's board of directors.

===== Symbility Solutions Inc. =====
Symbility Solutions Inc. is a firm that provides cloud-based technology for the insurance industry, with the specific purpose of making the claims process in property and health insurance more efficient and insurer-friendly. Paterson currently serves as the chairman for the company's board of directors. He has served in that position since 2004, which was when Symbility merged with Automated Benefits to go public. In the past several years, Symbility has enjoyed increased revenue. On March 18, 2013, the company published a report citing that company revenue increased by 108% to $16.54 million for the fiscal year ending December 31, 2012. This is in comparison to the company's revenue for fiscal year 2011, which was reported at $7.95 million. In December 2018 all of Symbility's outstanding shares were sold to CoreLogic and it is now a subsidiary of that company, ending Paterson's involvement.

===== NeuLion Inc. =====
Paterson previously served as vice chairman of NeuLion Inc., a company that provides video content to Internet-connected devices for sports leagues such as the NHL, the NFL, the NBA and the UFC. In 2005, Paterson became chairman of the company, which was known as JumpTV Inc. at the time. As chairman of JumpTV from 2005 to 2008 and chief executive officer of the company from 2005 to 2007, Paterson saw the firm through a number of transformative periods. In the summer of 2006, Paterson led the company through a successful US$65 million public offering led by Morgan Stanley on the Toronto Stock Exchange. Following this, Paterson led the company through a split merger with another rising online video technology company, NeuLion Inc. Paterson left the board of NeuLion in 2015.

===== FutureVault Inc. =====
Paterson is the Co-founder and Executive Chairman of FutureVault Inc., a Toronto-based information management company. FutureVault provides clients with a platform to securely store, organize and share their personal, financial and legal information and documents.

==== Acting career ====
Besides his work in the financial and investment field, in the past several years, Paterson has gained experience in the world of acting. In 2012, Paterson had a minor role in the action thriller A Dark Truth and, most recently, in 2013, Paterson completed work in another role in the thriller Breakout. As a result of his recent acting work, in 2013 Paterson became an active member of ACTRA, the Canadian actor's union.

=== Personal life ===
Paterson is married to his third wife, Sarah, and has 8 children.

==== Philanthropic efforts and contributions ====
In 1997, Paterson co-founded the Merry Go Round Children's Foundation, located in Toronto. The Merry Go Round Children's Foundation is responsible for organizing the "Kids, Cops & Computers" Program, which helps provide financially disadvantaged children in the Toronto area access to technology, like laptops and basic internet connection. Besides co-founding the Merry Go Round Children's Foundation, Paterson also serves as the foundation's chairman. Paterson has donated over $600,000 to the foundation.

===== Alma mater donations =====
As a student, Paterson received bursaries at Ridley College and the University of Western Ontario. Paterson has served for over a decade as a member of the board of governors of Ridley College. In 2004, Paterson gave a $1 million donation to his University of Western Ontario alma mater to open the G. Scott Paterson Wing in the school's Medical Sciences building. At the public announcement of his donation, Paterson described the impetus for his gift to the school in this way, "Ideas may start here that lead to discoveries that will extend or perhaps even save lives ... It's great to be a part of that."

==== Recognition ====
In 1998, Paterson was the recipient of Canada's "Top 40 Under 40 Award", which is presented to "exceptional Canadians under the age of 40 who are outstanding leaders in their chosen fields and who are shaping our country's future". A year later, in 1999, Paterson was recognized and profiled by Time magazine as one of "Canada's 21st Century Leaders".

In 2000, Paterson received recognition from his alma mater, the University of Western Ontario, by being presented with the Purple & White Award, given to Toronto-based alumni of the school who are "committed to and involved in University life while making a significant contribution to the Toronto area". Speaking about the honor given to Paterson, Dr. Paul Davenport, at the time, president of the University of Western Ontario, had this to say: "Scott's strong commitment to the University and his success as a Canadian business leader is something the entire Western community can be proud of."
