= Jérôme Rota =

French software developer

Jérôme Rota (born 1973, Saint-Jean-de-Védas) is a French software developer. He is also known by the name Gej.

In 1999, while he was working as a graphic designer and a technical director in an advertising agency in France, he made the "DivX ;-)" 3.11 Alpha video codec (the smiley was a part of the name) by hacking the Microsoft MPEG-4v3 codec (which was actually not MPEG-4 compliant) from Windows Media Tools 4 codecs. His hack had the advantage of supporting the AVI formatted files. Initial peer-to-peer rapid spread of the program turned into its introduction to the markets. As a result, a company was established.

The new project was first given the name ProjectMayo, and an open-source MPEG-4 codec called OpenDivX was made. It was later changed into a proprietary, closed-source product and the name was changed to DivX (dropping the smiley from the original MSMPEG-4 hack). Rota joined the company DivX, Inc. (formerly known as DivXNetworks, Inc.), based in San Diego, in 2000. The company employed up to 300 employees by February 2007.
