= MainConcept =

German software company

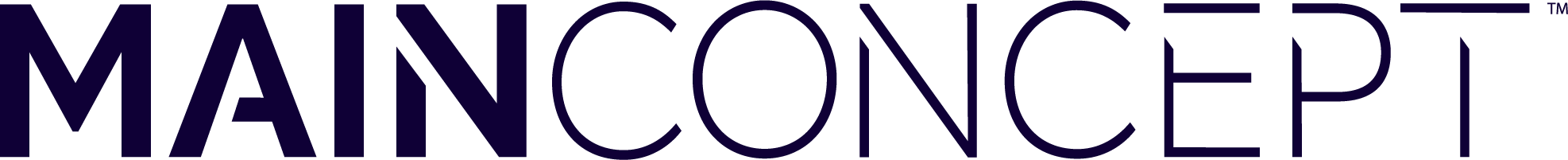
- Type: Private
- Industry: video/audio encoding, decoding, transcoding, software
- Founded: Aachen, Germany, 1993
- Founder: Markus Mönig, Thomas Zabel
- Headquarters: San Diego, USA, Aachen, Germany
- Area served: Worldwide
- Products: Codecs, software development kits, applications, plugins
- Number of employees: ~ 100 employees worldwide
- Website: www.mainconcept.com

MainConcept is a German software company. Since 1993, they have provided video and audio codecs for video production, multimedia, broadcast, digital signage, gaming, medical and security industries. Their codecs are used by organizations such as Adobe, AVID, Autodesk, Corel, Dalet, Grass Valley, MAGIX, MOG, Nikon, Sony and Wowza. These are offered along with software development kits, applications and plugins.

== History ==
MainConcept was founded in 1993 in Aachen, Germany, with an early focus on software codec development and supporting evolving video and audio compression standards.

MainConcept began shipping commercial codec products soon thereafter, including its first MPEG-1/2 codec. In 2004 it launched its own AVC/H.264 codec which is still in use today, followed in 2013 by HEVC/H.265 and in 2021 with VVC/H.266. In all, the company maintains a sizeable codec library covering implementations across numerous standards.

Starting in 2007, MainConcept has been owned by a succession of companies, starting with DivX, Inc. In 2010, DivX was acquired by Sonic Solutions and in 2011, Rovi Corporation acquired Sonic Solutions, bringing MainConcept under Rovi's corporate umbrella. In 2014, Rovi divested the DivX and MainConcept businesses, and in 2015 NeuLion acquired DivX (including the MainConcept business). In 2018, Endeavor Group Holdings acquired NeuLion and MainConcept, rebranding NeuLion as Endeavor Streaming, with MainConcept as a subsidiary. In October 2025, MainConcept announced that it had completed a management buyout, taking the company private.

Under the various levels of ownership, MainConcept continued to develop its codec and software development kit offerings, mostly operating separately from their parent.

In recent years, MainConcept has shifted its focus toward streaming, live and cloud encoding, and video quality measurement tools. The company maintains offices in Germany, the United States, and Japan, with a worldwide staff. As of the latest update, MainConcept continues to license codec technologies and deliver software development kits across broadcast, media, and OTT markets. Its codec implementations have been assessed in independent rankings, frequently coming out on top in competitive comparisons.

== Core products ==
=== Software development kits ===
AVC/H.264	Web Assembly HEVC Decoder	OTT Content Creation
HEVC/H.265	AV1	SCTE-35
VVC/H.266	JPEG 2000	MXF
JPEG XS	Motion JPEG	Network Streaming
LCEVC	VC-1	Transcoding
Multiview HEVC	Audio SDK	Converter & Scaler
MPEG 1/2	AAC	HDR
Decoder for Apple ProRes	Dolby Digital Plus	GStreamer

=== Applications and plugins ===
Live Encoder	Plugin for DaVinci Resolve Studio
FFmpeg plugins
Dolby Digital Plus Pro	Hybrid HEVC Encoder	HEVC Decoder
VVC Encoder	AVC Broadcast Encoder	AVC Decoder
MPEG-H Encoder	MPEG-2 TS Broadcast Delivery	Adobe AAC Encoder
xHE-AAC Encoder	MPEG-2 Production Format Encoder

== Notable customers and partners ==
Adobe	Avid	Autodesk	Dalet	AMD
Editshare	Grass Valley	Pebble	DeltaTre	Intel
MAGIX	Wowza	Telestream	Ross Video	Nvidia
Corel	Techex	Filmworkz	BroadStream	Qualcomm
Matrox	Amagi	Evertz	V-Nova	Samsung
Dataton	Sony	Nikon	Playbox Neo	Zixi
Colorfront	Veset	Nuon	Panasonic	Blackmagic Design

== See also ==
- High Efficiency Video Coding (HEVC)
