= DivX =

Brand of video codec products by DivX, LLC

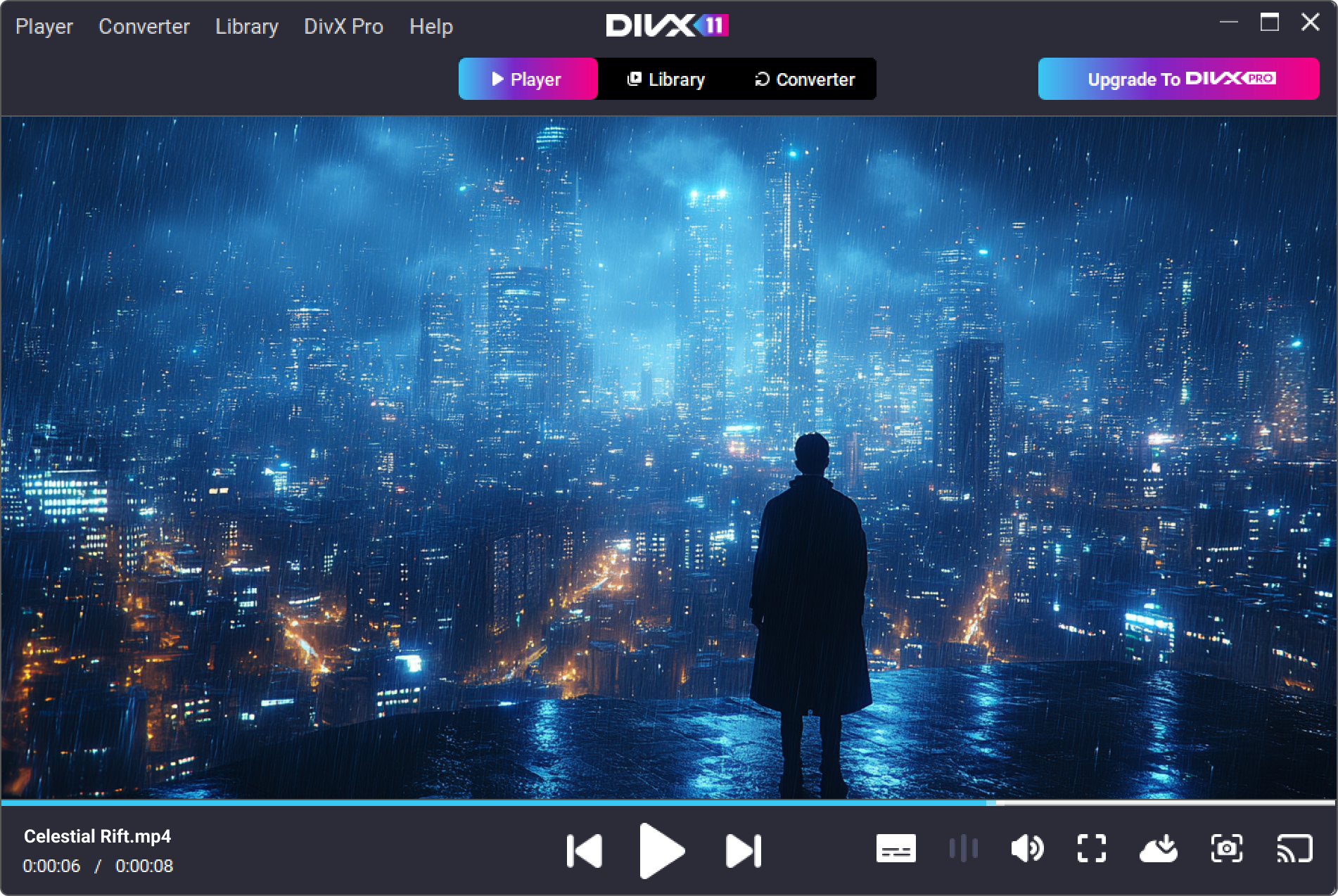
- DivX 11 Player, part of DivX 11 Software
- Developer: DivX, LLC
- Stable release: 11.16 / 30 September 2026; 32 days ago
- Operating system: Windows, macOS
- Type: Video codec, media player, video converter
- License: Freemium
- Website: www.divx.com

DivX is a family and brand of video codec products developed by DivX, LLC. There are three DivX codecs: the original MPEG-4 Part 2 DivX codec, the H.264/MPEG-4 AVC DivX Plus HD codec and the High Efficiency Video Coding DivX HEVC Ultra HD codec. The most recent version of the codec itself is version 6.9.2, which is several years old. New version numbers on the packages now reflect updates to the media player, converter, etc.

== History ==
The "DivX" brand is distinct from "DIVX", which is an obsolete video rental system. The winking emoticon in the early "DivX ;-)" codec name was a tongue-in-cheek reference to the DIVX system. Although not created by them, the DivX company adopted the name of the popular DivX ;-) codec. The company dropped the smiley and released DivX 4.0, which was actually the first DivX version to trademark the term DivX.

DivX ;-) (not DivX) 3.11 Alpha and later 3.xx versions refers to a hacked version of the Microsoft MPEG-4 Version 3 video codec (not to be confused with MPEG-4 Part 3) from Windows Media Tools 4 codecs. The video codec, which was actually not MPEG-4 compliant, was extracted around 1998 by French hacker Jerome Rota (also known as Gej) at Montpellier. The Microsoft codec originally required that the compressed output be put in an ASF file. It was altered to allow other containers such as Audio Video Interleave (AVI). Rota hacked the Microsoft codec because newer versions of the Windows Media Player would not play his video portfolio and résumé that were encoded with it. Instead of re-encoding his portfolio, Rota and German hacker Max Morice decided to reverse engineer the codec, which "took about a week".

In early 2000, Jordan Greenhall recruited Rota to form a company (originally called DivXNetworks, Inc., renamed to DivX, Inc. in 2005) to develop an MPEG-4 codec, from scratch, that would still be backward-compatible with the Microsoft MPEG-4 Version 3 format. This effort resulted first in the release of the "OpenDivX" codec and source code on 15 January 2001. OpenDivX was hosted as an open-source project on the Project Mayo web site hosted at projectmayo.com (the name comes from "mayonnaise", because, according to Rota, DivX and mayonnaise are both "French and very hard to make."). The company's internal developers and some external developers worked jointly on OpenDivX for the next several months, but the project eventually stagnated.

In early 2001, DivX employee "Sparky" wrote a new and improved version of the codec's encoding algorithm known as "encore2". This code was included in the OpenDivX public source repository for a brief time, but then was abruptly removed. The explanation from DivX at the time was that "the community really wants a Winamp, not a Linux." It was at this point that the project forked. That summer, Rota left the French Riviera and moved to San Diego "with nothing but a pack of cigarettes" where he and Greenhall founded what would eventually become DivX, Inc.

DivX took the encore2 code and developed it into DivX 4.0, initially released in July 2001. Other developers who had participated in OpenDivX took encore2 and started a new project—Xvid—that started with the same encoding core. DivX, Inc. has since continued to develop the DivX codec, releasing DivX 5.0 in March 2002. By the release of version 5.2.1 on 8 September 2004, the DivX codec was substantially feature-complete. Changes since then have tended to focus on speed, and encouraging wider hardware player support, while the company has also focused its time on the formats and next generation codecs.

In February 2011, DivX was acquired by Rovi Corporation, upon completion of its acquisition of Sonic Solutions. In 2014, Blackstone Group and Parallax Capital acquired DivX from Rovi for $75 million. On January 5, 2015, it was announced that IPTV company NeuLion would acquire DivX for $62.5 million. In February 2018, a deal was finalized to sell certain DivX assets, intellectual property and subsidiaries from NeuLion, Inc. to Fortress Investment Group.

DivX, LLC continues to operate from their headquarters in San Diego and release new versions of DivX Software for Windows and macOS.

== DivX formats ==
=== DivX Media Format (DMF) ===
DivX Media Format
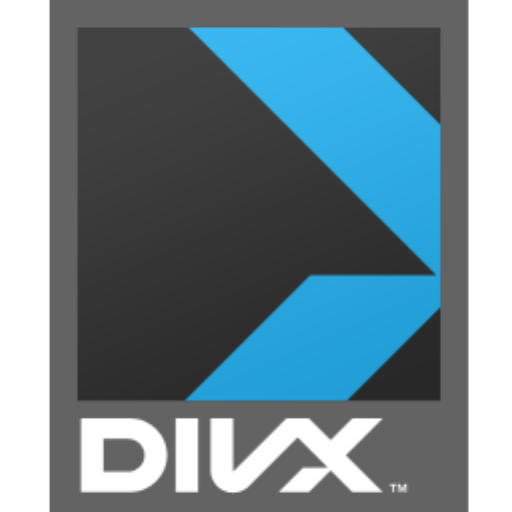
- Filename extension: .divx
- Type code: DIVX, DX50
- Developed by: DivX, Inc.
- Initial release: 15 June 2005; 21 years ago
- Type of format: Container format
- Container for: MPEG-4 Part 2–compliant video
- Extended from: AVI
- Free format?: No

DivX 6 expanded the scope of DivX from including just a codec and a player by adding an optional media container format called "DivX Media Format" ("DMF") (with a .divx extension) that includes support for the following DVD-Video and VOB container like features. This media container format is used for the MPEG-4 Part 2 codec.

This new DivX Media Format also came with a "DivX Ultra Certified" profile, and all "Ultra" certified players must support all DivX Media Format features. While video encoded with the DivX codec is an MPEG-4 video stream, the DivX Media Format is analogous to media container formats such as Apple's QuickTime. In much the same way that media formats such as DVD specify MPEG-2 video as a part of their specification, the DivX Media Format specifies MPEG-4-compatible video as a part of its specification. However, despite the use of the ".divx" extension, this format is an extension to the AVI file format. The methods of including multiple audio and even subtitle tracks involve storing the data in RIFF headers and other such AVI hacks which have been known for quite a while, such that even VirtualDubMod supports them. DivX, Inc. did this on purpose to keep at least partial backward compatibility with AVI, so that players that do not support the new features available to the .divx container format (like interactive menus, chapter points and XSUB subtitles) can at least play that primary video stream (usually the main movie if the DMF file contains multiple video streams like special features like bonus materials). Of course, the DivX codec and tools like Dr. DivX still support the traditional method of creating standard AVI files.

Since version 5.0 of DivX, the FourCC (identifying code) for the DivX MPEG-4 Part 2 codec is DX50. Previously it used DIVX.

=== DivX Plus HD ===
DivX Plus HD is a marketing name for a file type using the standard Matroska media container format (.mkv), rather than the proprietary DivX Media Format. DivX Plus HD files contain an H.264 video bitstream, AAC surround sound audio, and a number of XML-based attachments defining chapters, subtitles and meta data. This media container format is used for the H.264/MPEG-4 AVC codec.

=== DivX profiles ===
DivX has defined profiles which are subsets of MPEG-4/AVI and H.264/Matroska standards. Because the grouping is a specific subset of what is in the standards, there are certification processes for each of the profiles that device manufacturers must follow. All DivX certified devices bearing a DivX logo will adhere to one of the profiles outlined in the table below as would any tools that support the DivX profiles.

Profiles
	Handheld	Portable	Mobile Theater	Home Theater	HD 720p	HD 1080p	+HD 1080p
DivX Codec (MPEG-4 Part 2)	5,6	5,6	5,6	3,4,5,6	5,6	3,4,5,6	n/a
DivX H.264 Codec (MPEG-4 Part 10)	n/a	n/a	n/a	n/a	n/a	n/a	1.x
File Extension(s)	.avi, .divx	.avi, .divx	.avi, .divx	.avi, .divx	.avi, .divx	.avi, .divx	.mkv
Max. resolution (px×px×Hz)	176×144×15	352×240×30 352×288×25	640×480×30	720×480×30 720×576×25	1280×720×30	3/4: 720×480×30, 720×576×25 5/6: 1920×1080×30, 1280×720×60	1920×1080×30, 1280×720×60
Max VBV bitrate (bit/s)		600000	4854000	4854000	9708400	20000000	VCL: 20000000, NAL: 24000000
Min. VBV buffer size (KiB)	32	138	384	384	768	2097	VCL: 3200, NAL: 3840
Macroblocks (per second)	1485	9900	36000	40500	108000	3/4: 40500 5/6: 244800	244800
Subtitles	optional	optional	optional	8×XSUB	8×XSUB	8×XSUB, XSUB+	8×SRT, SSA
Audio		1×MP3	1×MP3	8×MP3, MP2, AC3	8×MP3, MP2, AC3	8×MP3, MP2, AC3	8×MP3, AC3, AAC

=== DivX Video on Demand ===
DivX Video on Demand (DivX VOD) is DivX's version of digital rights management (DRM), which allows content copyright holders to control distribution. In 2009, DivX, Inc. received format approval from major Hollywood studios including Sony, Paramount, and Lionsgate, which has allowed content retailers to sell protected videos that will play on current and previous generations of DivX certified devices. The terms of the contract are not known, so it is unknown if that approval is still in effect.

== Community software ==
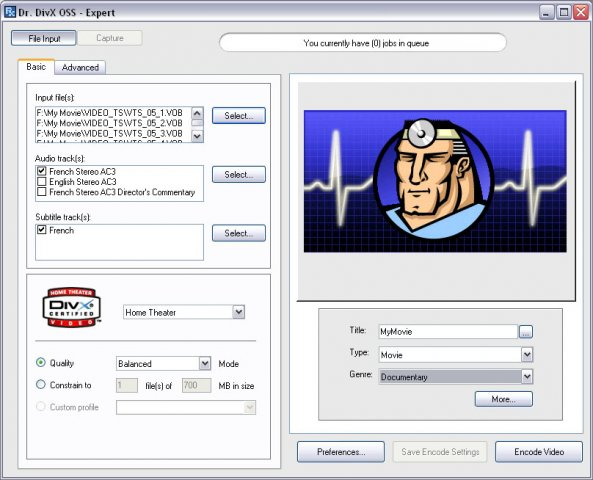
Dr. DivX OSS 2 for Windows

Dr. DivX OSS is capable of transcoding many video formats to DivX-encoded video. The original closed-source Dr. DivX terminated at version 1.06 for DivX 5.21. That was the last version of DivX capable of running on Windows 9x. An open-source version has since been made, which supports DivX 6. Dr. DivX offers greatly expanded features over the free DivX Converter application, that was bundled with the codec from version 6 onwards. Dr. DivX is not compatible with DivX Plus HD.

DivX has released a command line interface (CLI) for the divx264 encoder used in the DivX Converter as beta, free for non-commercial use. To complement the CLI divx264 encoder released on DivX Labs, DivX has also released a DivX AAC encoder CLI as a Windows beta binary. Finally, DivXMKVMux has been released as a free Windows CLI through DivX Labs with documentation on the DivX Developer Portal; DivX describes the release as a reference mux to demonstrate DivX Plus MKV extensions like World Fonts and Smooth FF/RW.

== Hardware support ==
DivX, Inc. markets a certification program to consumer electronics and IC manufacturers for the purpose of guaranteed compatibility and playback of video files that fall within DivX profiles. Devices that have been DivX certified usually brandish one of the following marks:

- DivX Certified
- DivX Certified for HD 720p and 1080p
- DivX Certified for DivX Plus HD
- DivX Connected
- DivX Certified for DivX Ultra

DivX certified devices have included DVD players, car stereos, mobile phones, televisions, Blu-ray players, and even alarm clocks.

Aside from verifying proper decoding of files conforming to the DivX profiles the certification also confirms the device can play back DivX Video on Demand content, which includes Hollywood content that can be purchased from Internet retailers.

=== Gaming system compatibility ===
On 4 December 2007, native MPEG-4 ASP playback support was added to the Xbox 360, allowing it to play video encoded with DivX and other MPEG-4 ASP codecs.

On 17 December 2007, firmware upgrade 2.10 was released for the Sony PlayStation 3, which included official DivX Certification. Firmware version 2.50 (released on 15 October 2008) included support for the DivX Video on Demand (DivX VOD) service, and firmware version 2.60 (released on 20 January 2009) included official DivX Certification and updated Profile support to version 3.11.

With introduction of DivX to Go in the DivX Player for Windows, a PlayStation 3 icon is readily available on the interface, which will invoke a transfer wizard for freely converting and copying video files via USB or optical disc. The output from DivX to Go's PlayStation 3 preset is also playable on the Xbox 360.
