= Endeavor Streaming =

Digital video company

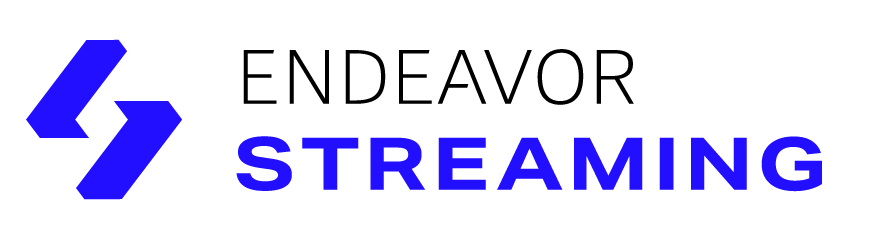
- Type: Private
- Industry: Streaming media Video on demand
- Predecessor: NeuLion
- Founded: January 14, 2019; 7 years ago
- Founder: Endeavor (now The WME Group)
- Headquarters: New York City, New York, United States
- Areas served: United States; International
- Brands: The Vesper Platform
- Services: Streaming and web services Business consulting
- Parent: Deltatre
- Website: www.deltatre.com

Endeavor Streaming is a multinational digital video distribution and streaming company. The company works with professional sports leagues and entertainment companies to distribute live and on-demand content. It also offers various business services.

Previously operating as a subsidiary of the American company Endeavor, Endeavor Streaming was formed in January 2019 in part through the rebranding of NeuLion, which had been founded in 2004 and acquired by Endeavor in 2018. Deltatre acquired Endeavor Streaming in 2025.

== History ==
=== Predecessor companies ===
NeuLion, later Endeavor Streaming, was founded as a private technology company in 2004. Headquartered in Plainview, New York, among its co-founders were Charles Wang and Nancy Li. NeuLion merged with JumpTV in 2008, then JumpTV Inc. changed its name to NeuLion, Inc. in 2009 and continued trading on the Toronto Stock Exchange under the new name. NeuLion acquired Interactive Netcasting Systems in 2009, and TransVideo International in 2010.

By 2015, customers included the National Football League (NFL), Sky in New Zealand, and the EFL, among others. With competition in the sports streaming market increasing, NeuLion lost the NHL as a client when the league moved its contract to BAMTech. NeuLion acquired DivX, Inc. in 2015, with former DivX CEO Kanaan Jemili becoming CEO of NeuLion, which gave NeuLion access to DivX's 4K Ultra HD technology, and integrated into devices such as LG, Samsung, and Sony.

In 2016, the company partnered with the NBA, UFC, and Univision on trial streams of 4K games, where NeuLion's 2016 broadcast of UFC 205 became the first global pay-per-view event to be live streamed in 4K. NeuLion acquired Saffron Digital in that year, and Roy Reichbach was named President and CEO. In March 2018, NeuLion agreed to be acquired by Endeavor for US$250 million, becoming a privately held subsidiary. As part of the deal NeuLion retained 550 employees, including 125 at its Long Island headquarters it had moved into in 2016. The deal was finalized in May 2018 and NeuLion common stock was delisted from the Toronto Stock Exchange.

=== Endeavor Streaming ===
Endeavor Streaming was formed by Endeavor Group in January 2019, with the new division including Endeavor's video streaming products and services and also absorbing NeuLion. The new subsidiary was described as a "direct-to-consumer streaming unit, which conducts front and back end operations" for sports leagues and media companies. Endeavor Streaming maintained contracts with former NeuLion clients such as Univision, Sky Sports, the NFL, NBA, UFC, and Big Ten Network, and announced WWE as a new client. On January 5, 2024, Endeavor Streaming began distributing Total Nonstop Action Wrestling's (TNA) subscription service TNA+.

Endeavor hired Fred Santarpia to run Endeavor Streaming in November 2020. Business Insider wrote that Santarpia would oversee global expansion. In 2021 and 2022, it launched OTT platforms for networks and sports organizations in Europe, Japan, and the Philippines. In recent years, the company has also offered business consulting and predictive analysis on matters related to OTT platforms.

In 2025, Deltatre acquired Endeavor Streaming, marking a new era for both companies and further strengthening Deltatre’s leadership across the digital and OTT market with broader capabilities and expanded reach.

== Products and services ==
=== Vesper Platform ===
Endeavor Streaming is an over-the-top (OTT) platform provider, customizing streaming applications for media companies, networks and major sports franchises. In particular, it creates direct-to-consumer (DTC) streaming services, which are compatible with desktop computers, iOS and Android devices, and various connected TV devices.

The company calls its end-to-end video streaming platform the Vesper Platform. The platform primarily distributes premium sports and entertainment content, live and on-demand. The platform also has a number of distribution and management features, including a monetization suite, analytics and data aggregation, machine learning, playback options, stream security, and subscriber management. There are also features to optimize content for viewers, such as localization of content and bookmarking between devices.

Endeavor Streaming incorporated live shopping into its own platform in 2022, and also created a platform for channel customization and distribution, streaming on free ad-supported streaming television (FAST) services, such as The Roku Channel and Samsung TV Plus.

=== Consulting ===
Endeavor Streaming offers services such as business consulting, analytics, and predictive modeling in relation to over-the-top (OTT) and direct-to-consumer (DTC) media streaming. Its DTC growth services division consults on scaling and topics such as churn rate, pricing, and marketing. In 2023, Endeavor Streaming published a whitepaper on streaming and market trends in collaboration with SportsPro.
