= DivX, LLC =

Video technology company

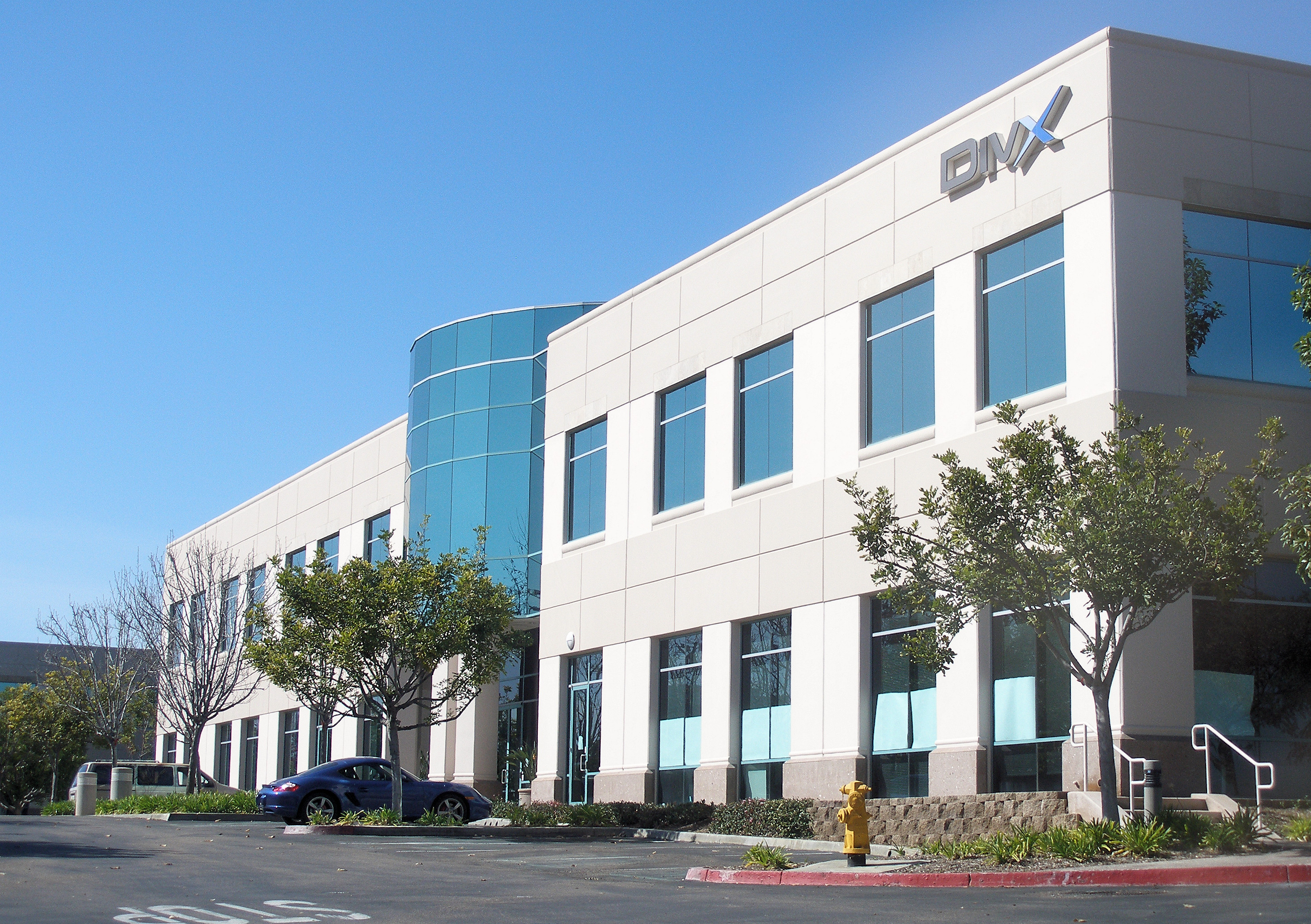
- DivX's headquarters in San Diego (pictured in 2008)
- Type: Private
- Industry: Video technology
- Founded: 2000
- Headquarters: San Diego, California, U.S.
- Key people: Kevin Hell; Jerome "Gej" Vashisht-Rota
- Products: DivX Software for Windows, DivX Pro for Windows, DivX Software for Mac, DivX Pro for Mac
- Website: www.divx.com

DivX, LLC (/ˈdɪvɪks/; also formerly known as DivXNetworks, Inc. and DiVX, Inc.) is a privately held American video technology company based in San Diego, California. DivX, LLC is best known for creating the DivX family of digital video codecs. The company's software has been downloaded over 1 billion times since January 2003.

The DivX codecs include the namesake MPEG-4 Part 2-based codec, the H.264/MPEG-4 AVC DivX Plus codec and the High Efficiency Video Coding DivX HEVC Ultra HD codec. DivX, LLC's offerings have expanded beyond the codec to include software for viewing and authoring DivX-encoded video. DivX, LLC also licenses its technologies to manufacturers of consumer electronics devices and components used in these devices, of which over 1 billion DivX-enabled devices have shipped worldwide. DivX certifies that these licensed products are able to properly play DivX-encoded video.

== History ==
The origin of DivX, Inc. began with video engineer Jérôme Rota (aka Gej), who made the original "DivX ;-)" codec available on his personal website after he had reverse-engineered the Microsoft MPEG-4 V3 codec. Gej was looking for a way to compress his portfolio so he could transmit it using the Audio Video Interleave file format (AVI). The codec became popular because it enabled reasonable quality video transmission over the internet (see DivX). Co-founder Jordan Greenhall, a former Mp3.com executive, learned of the codec from friends, and used it to download a copy of "The Matrix". Greenhall eventually got in touch with Gej through an underground Dutch hacker group after a multi-month search. In early 2000, Greenhall put forward the idea of using the "DivX ;-)" codec to found a company. With co-founders Joe Bezdek, Darrius Thompson and, Greenhall and Gej created DivXNetworks, Inc. After coming under scrutiny for the original "DivX ;-)" codec, which was not a clean room design codec, DivXNetworks created a new, clean room codec.

In 2005, the company was renamed DivX, Inc. The company incurred net losses from its creation through the second quarter of 2005. The company was profitable for fiscal years 2005–07.

DivX, Inc. went public on September 27, 2006. It was listed on NASDAQ under the ticker symbol DIVX. In December 2006, DivX, Inc. was added to the Russell 2000 and Russell 3000 Indexes.

In November 2007, DivX bought MainConcept AG, a specialist provider of video and audio codec solutions.

In October 2010, Sonic Solutions completed their acquisition of DivX.

In February 2011, Rovi Corporation acquired Sonic Solutions (including the DivX business).

In April 2014, Rovi Corporation sold the DivX and MainConcept business to Parallax Capital Partners and StepStone Group.

In February 2015, NeuLion, Inc. acquired DivX, LLC.

In February 2018, a deal was finalized to sell certain DivX assets, intellectual property and subsidiaries from NeuLion, Inc. to Fortress Investment Group.

== Revenue streams ==
DivX, LLC licenses its technologies to manufacturers of consumer electronic devices. DivX, LLC also licenses its technologies to manufacturers of integrated circuits designed to be used in consumer electronic devices. For example, on September 12, 2007, DivX, Inc. announced a licensing agreement with Qualcomm that allows the chip manufacturer to include DivX, Inc.'s technology in its video-enabled chipsets.

In addition to licensing, DivX, Inc. also certifies devices that can encode and/or play-back videos using the company's codec according to DivX, Inc.'s standards. The company has certified DVD players, digital televisions, digital cameras, portable video players, and portable video recorders. DivX, Inc.'s partners have shipped over 1 billion certified consumer electronic devices, representing over 2500 product models. Partners include LG Electronics, Philips Electronics, Samsung Electronics, and Sony Electronics.

The licensing and certification agreements that DivX, Inc. strikes with its partners usually entitle DivX, Inc. to receive a per-unit royalty for every device shipped that incorporates DivX, Inc.'s technology and is certified by DivX, Inc. Approximately 75% of all royalties DivX, Inc. received are for products sold in countries outside of the United States, as DivX-encoded video is more popular in certain regions outside of the United States than it is in the United States. Royalties resulting from licensing are approximately $1 to $2 per unit shipped.

Prior to November 2007, DivX, Inc. also received revenue from Google by providing the option to download the Google Toolbar when downloading the DivX Player from the company's website. In November 2007, DivX, Inc.'s contract with Google expired, and the company started distributing a co-branded version of the Yahoo! Toolbar and a version of Internet Explorer 7 that was pre-configured with Yahoo! tools. DivX Inc.'s financial reporting for the third quarter of 2008 indicated that the Yahoo! deal was proving to be more lucrative than the previous Google deal. Soon after the company reported third quarter results, however, Yahoo! advised DivX, Inc. that it would cease making payments under the contract. DivX, Inc. responded by suing Yahoo! in California Superior Court seeking damages and specific performance of the contract. The company acknowledged, though, that its breach of the prior contract would materially affect its financial performance for 2008 and 2009. (In the first nine months of 2008, the Yahoo! deal accounted for 21% of DivX, Inc.'s revenue.) DivX, Inc. and Yahoo! settled their dispute in August 2009. Under the settlement, Yahoo! paid $9.5 million to DivX, Inc. In March, 2009, DivX, Inc. entered into a new promotion and distribution agreement with Google. Under the agreement DivX, Inc. would distribute Google products such as the Chrome browser and Google Toolbar along with its own products and would receive fees from Google for successful activations of these products.

== Stage6 ==
Stage 6 was a user-generated content site run by DivX, Inc. that was similar to YouTube but that allowed for uploading and viewing of high-definition video. Anyone could upload a video to Stage6 and make it available for viewing for free. All videos on Stage6 were playable on all consumer electronics devices that DivX had certified as being capable of playing DivX encoded video. Stage6 contributed to divx.com becoming one of the top 200 most-visited websites according to the site Alexa.com. Stage6 received a "Very Good" rating from PC World Magazine.

On September 6, 2007, DivX, Inc. filed a declaratory judgment action in federal district court in San Diego against Universal Music Group, Inc. In the lawsuit, DivX, Inc. sought a declaration from the court that DivX Inc.'s operation of Stage6 fell within the safe harbor protection provided by the Digital Millennium Copyright Act for hosting websites against claims of copyright infringement. Previously, UMG had demanded that DivX, Inc. take a license from the company to cover works on Stage6 that it owned and, in addition, pay UMG $30 million for past damages. On October 16, 2007, UMG filed an action against DivX, Inc. in federal district court in Los Angeles for copyright infringement. UMG then moved to have the San Diego action dismissed in favor of the Los Angeles action. On February 5, 2008, the judge in the San Diego action granted UMG's motion to dismiss.

On July 24, 2007, DivX, Inc. announced that it intended to separate Stage6 into its own separate private company because Stage6's success has resulted in significant expenses that have impacted DivX, Inc.'s bottom line. In December 2007, DivX, Inc. announced that it needed additional time to consider the alternatives available to the company with respect to the future of Stage6.

On February 25, 2008, DivX, Inc. announced its plan to permanently shut down Stage6 on February 28, 2008, instead of selling it or spinning it off.

Prior to the decision to close the site, disagreements within DivX, Inc. on what to do with site appears to have led to the resignations of senior personnel, including co-founders Jordan Greenhall and Darrius Thompson.

== Acquisitions and investments ==
In August 2007, DivX, Inc. announced that it had acquired the assets of Veatros, LLC, a Lawrence, Kansas-based company. Veatros developed video processing technology at the University of Kansas' Information and Telecommunication Technology Center. The technology can be used for video search and discovery. The deal was for $2 million in cash plus an additional $2.5 million upon completion of certain technology-related milestones.

In November 2007, DivX, Inc. purchased Aachen, Germany based MainConcept AG. DivX, Inc. paid $22 million for the company, and will pay up to additional $6 million upon the completion of certain milestones in 2008. MainConcept developed and distributes one of the most popular codecs using the H.264 standard.

== Awards ==
- DivX, Inc. was selected as a Top 100 Private Company Award Winner 2006 by OnHollywood.
- DivX, Inc. was ranked No. 1 in Entrepreneur Magazine's Hot 500 list for 2007.
- DivX, Inc. was awarded Deloitte's elite Technology Fast 500 award 2007–2009.
