= Comparison of video player software =

The following comparison of video players compares general and technical information for notable software media player programs.

For the purpose of this comparison, video players are defined as any media player that can play video, even if it can also play audio files.

== General ==
=== Active players ===
Name	Author	First public release	Stable version	Cost	Software license	Framework used	Written in
ALLPlayer	ALLPlayer Group Ltd. Partnership	1998	8.9.2 (April 4, 2022; 4 years ago) [±]	No cost	Proprietary	FFmpeg + original + DirectShow	Object Pascal (Delphi)
Elmedia Player	Electronic Team, Inc.	2005	8.24 (December 5, 2025)	Free, PRO features $19.99	Proprietary	libmpv + FFmpeg + other	Objective C
Apprentice Video	Pavel Koshevoy	29 May 2010	r407 and later	No cost	MIT	FFmpeg	C++ (Qt)
DivX	DivX, LLC	15 July 2001	11.16 (September 30, 2026)	No cost	Proprietary	Proprietary	C/C++ (Qt)
FFplay	FFmpeg project	20 December 2000	9.0.2 18 September 2026	No cost	LGPL-2.1-or-later, part GPL-2.0-or-later	FFmpeg	C
GOM Player	GOM & Company	7 January 2003	Windows 2.3.116 (February 24, 2026; 7 months ago) iOS 1.5.1 (February 26, 2020; 6 years ago) Android 1.6.1 (August 30, 2021; 5 years ago) [±]	No cost	Proprietary	FFmpeg	?
iTunes	Apple Inc.	9 January 2001		No cost	Proprietary	QuickTime	?
jetAudio (Basic)	Cowon Systems	1997	8.1.8.20800 (6 August 2020; 6 years ago)	No cost	Proprietary	FFmpeg	C++
jetAudio (Plus)	Cowon Systems	1997	8.1.8.20800 (6 August 2020; 6 years ago)	$29	Proprietary	FFmpeg	C++
JRiver Media Center	JRiver, Inc.	1998	34.0.24 (Windows) (May 6, 2025; 16 months ago) [±]	$69.98 to $89.98	Proprietary	original + DirectShow	C++, SSE/MMX assembly
K-Multimedia Player	YoungHuee Kang	1 October 2002	4.2.2.588 (3 December 2021; 4 years ago) [±]	No cost	Proprietary	DirectShow	Object Pascal
Mac Blu-ray Player	Macgo Inc.	2011	3.3.21 (28 August 2021; 5 years ago)	$59.95	Proprietary	?	?
MediaPortal	Team MediaPortal	2004	2.4 (December 30, 2021; 4 years ago) [±]	No cost	GPL	DirectShow	C#, C++
Media Player Classic Home Cinema	Gabest	29 March 2006	2.3.8 (November 27, 2024; 22 months ago) [±]	No cost	GPL-3.0-or-later	FFmpeg + DirectShow	C++
Microsoft Movies & TV (formerly Xbox Video)	Microsoft	26 October 2012		No cost	Proprietary		
Microsoft Photos	Microsoft	26 October 2012		No cost	Proprietary		
MPlayer	Árpád Gereöffy	September 2000	1.5 27 February 2022	No cost	GPL-2.0-or-later	FFmpeg + original	C
mpv	mpv Community	7 August 2013	0.41.0 21 December 2025	No cost	GPL-2.0-or-later, part LGPL-2.1-or-later	FFmpeg	C, Objective C, Lua
Plex Media Player	Plex, Inc.	21 May 2008	Windows: 2.57.0.1074 (May 5, 2020; 6 years ago) [±] macOS: 2.57.0.1074 (May 5, 2020; 6 years ago) [±] iOS: 7.28.1 (February 8, 2022; 4 years ago) [±] Android: 8.29.1.30697 (February 15, 2022; 4 years ago) [±]	No cost	Proprietary	FFmpeg	C++
PotPlayer	Kakao	2006	1.7.23121 (August 20, 2026) [±]	No cost	Proprietary	DirectShow	?
PowerDVD Standard	CyberLink	1998	PowerDVD 24 (2025-07-08) [±]	$59.99	Proprietary	DirectShow	?
PowerDVD Pro	CyberLink	1998	PowerDVD 24 (2025-07-08) [±]	$79.95	Proprietary	DirectShow	?
PowerDVD Ultra	CyberLink	1998	PowerDVD 24 (2025-07-08) [±]	$99.99	Proprietary	DirectShow	?
QuickTime X	Apple Inc.	28 August 2009	10.5 (August 31, 2018; 8 years ago) [±]	No cost	Proprietary	QuickTime	Cocoa (on OS X)
RealPlayer	RealNetworks	April 1995	Windows: 25.0.2.304 (July 8, 2026; 2 months ago) [±] OS X: 12.0.1.1750 (September 7, 2012; 14 years ago) [±] Windows Mobile: 1.1 (July 30, 2009; 17 years ago) [±] Android: 1.61 (October 23, 2024; 23 months ago) [±]	No cost	Proprietary	original	?
SMPlayer	Ricardo Villalba	11 December 2006	26.8.29 30 August 2026	No cost	GPL-2.0-or-later	MPlayer	C++ (Qt)
GNOME Videos (formerly Totem)	The GNOME Project	February 2003	43.2 21 May 2025	No cost	GPL-2.0-or-later + exception	GStreamer	C
Videostream	Videostream Team	February 2014	2.1.3.15	No cost	Proprietary	Chrome + FFmpeg	JavaScript, C++
VLC	VideoLAN	1 February 2001	Windows, Linux, & macOS: 3.0.24 / 22 September 2026; 9 days ago; Android: 3.7.0 / 8 January 2026; 8 months ago; ChromeOS: 1.7.3 / 23 December 2015; 10 years ago; iOS, Apple TV: 3.7.2 / 30 March 2026; 6 months ago; Windows (UWP): 3.1.2 / 20 July 2018; 8 years ago; Windows Phone: 3.1.2 / 20 July 2018; 8 years ago	No cost	GPL-2.0-or-later, LGPL-2.1-or-later	libVLC + FFmpeg	C, C++
WinDVD Pro	Corel	1998	WinDVD Pro 12 Service Pack 8 (April 28, 2021; 5 years ago) [±]	$79.99	Proprietary	DirectShow	?
Kodi (formerly XBMC)	Team-Kodi (formerly Team-XBMC)	2002	19.3 (codename: "Matrix") (October 25, 2021; 4 years ago) [±]	No cost	GPL-2.0-or-later	FFmpeg	C++
xine	xine Team	15 August 2000	0.99.14 (January 7, 2023; 3 years ago) [±]	No cost	GPL-2.0-or-later	xine-lib + FFmpeg	C
sView	Kirill Gavrilov	2009	22.01 (January 6, 2022)	No cost	GPL-3.0-or-later	FFmpeg	C++
IPTVX	IPTVX LLC	3 April 2019	14.4.2 (tvOS), 5.4.2 (iOS)	$13.99/year	Proprietary	VLCKit	Objective-C / Swift / Kotlin
Name	Author	First public release	Stable version	Cost	Software license	Framework used	Written in

=== Inactive players ===
Name	Author	First public release	Stable version	Cost	Software license	Framework used	Written in
Banshee	Aaron Bockover	2005-02-17	2.6.2 (February 18, 2014; 12 years ago) [±]	No cost	MIT	GStreamer	C#
CorePlayer	CoreCodec Inc.	2006	3.0.1.0 (September 9, 2011; 15 years ago) [±]	?	Proprietary	?	?
Creative MediaSource	Creative Technology	2002	5.10.38 (December 22, 2006; 19 years ago) [±]	Requires Creative product	Proprietary	DirectShow	?
DSPlayer	DSPlayer team	2002	0.889 (12 February 2007; 19 years ago) [±]	No cost	Proprietary		Object Pascal (Delphi), C++
Media Player Classic	Gabest	May 29, 2003	6.4.9.1 Revision 107 (February 14, 2010; 16 years ago) [±]	No cost	GPL-2.0-or-later	DirectShow	C++
Ogle	Chalmers University of Technology	1999	0.9.2 (November 6, 2003; 22 years ago) [±]	No cost	GPL	?	C
Quintessential Player	Paul Quinn	1997	5.0.121 (February 18, 2009; 17 years ago) [±]	No cost	Proprietary	?	?
Songbird	Tom Lord	February 8, 2006	2.2.0, Build 2453 (February 4, 2013; 13 years ago) [±]	No cost	GPL	GStreamer, XULRunner	C++
The Core Pocket Media Player	Gabor Kovacs	2004 Jul as "BetaPlayer"	0.71 (November 23, 2005; 20 years ago) [±]	No cost	GPL	FFmpeg + original	C++
TotalMedia Theatre	ArcSoft	November 15, 2009	6.7.1.199 June 6, 2014; 12 years ago	?	Proprietary	original	C++
QuickTime	Apple Inc.	1991-12-02	7.7.9 (January 7, 2016; 10 years ago) [±]	No cost	Proprietary	QuickTime	Cocoa (on OS X)
Winamp Lite, Full, Bundle	Nullsoft	Jun 1997	5.9.2 Build 10042 (April 26, 2023; 3 years ago) [±]	No cost	Proprietary	?	?
Winamp Pro	Nullsoft	Jun 1997	5.9.2 Build 10042 (April 26, 2023; 3 years ago) [±]	?	Proprietary	?	?
Windows Media Player	Microsoft	Nov 1992	July 2026 Update (11.2607.16) (August 28, 2026; 34 days ago) [±]	No cost	Proprietary	DirectShow	C++ (COM)
Name	Author	First public release	Stable version	Cost	Software license	Framework used	Written in

== Operating system compatibility ==
This section lists the operating systems on which the player works. There may be multiple versions of a player, each one for a given operating system.

Video player	Windows	macOS	iOS	Android	Linux	BSD Unix	Solaris	Unix-like	DOS	BeOS, Haiku, ZETA	OS/2
ALLPlayer	Yes	No	No	Yes	No	No	No	No	No	No	No
Elmedia Player	No	Yes	No	No	No	No	No	No	No	No	No
Apprentice Video	Yes	Yes	No	No	Yes	Yes	No	No	No	No	No
DivX	Yes	Yes	No	No	No	No	No	No	No	No	No
GOM Player	Yes	Yes	Yes	Yes	No	No	No	No	No	No	No
Microsoft Movies & TV (formerly Xbox Video)	Yes	No	No	No	No	No	No	No	No	No	No
iTunes	Yes	Included	Included	No	No	No	No	No	No	No	No
jetVideo	Yes	No	No	Yes	No	No	No	No	No	No	No
JRiver Media Center	Yes	Yes	No	No	Yes	No	No	No	No	No	No
K-Multimedia Player	Yes	Alpha version	Yes	Yes	No	No	No	No	No	No	No
Mac Blu-ray Player	Yes	Yes	Yes	No	No	No	No	No	No	No	No
Media Player Classic Home Cinema	Yes	No	No	No	No	No	No	No	No	No	No
MediaPortal	Yes	No	No	No	No	No	No	No	No	No	No
MPlayer	Yes	Yes	No	No	Yes	Yes	Yes	No	Yes	Yes	Yes
mpv	Yes	Yes	No	Yes	Yes	Yes	No	Yes	No	No	No
Plex Media Player	Yes	Yes	Yes	Yes	Yes	No	No	No	No	No	No
PotPlayer	Yes	No	No	No	No	No	No	No	No	No	No
QuickTime Player	Yes	Included	Included	No	No	No	No	No	No	No	No
RealPlayer	Yes	Yes	No	Yes	Yes	Yes	Yes	Yes	No	No	No
SMPlayer	Yes	No	No	No	Yes	Yes	No	No	No	No	No
GNOME Videos (formerly Totem)	No	No	No	No	Yes	Yes	Yes	Yes	No	No	No
Videostream	Yes	Yes	No	Yes	Yes	No	No	No	No	No	No
VLC	Yes	Yes	Yes	Yes	Yes	Yes	Yes	Yes	Yes	Yes	Yes
Winamp	Yes	Beta version	No	Yes	Last version is Winamp 3	No	No	No	No	No	No
Windows Media Player	Included	Dropped (WMP9)	No	No	No	No	Dropped (WMP6.3)	No	No	No	No
Kodi (formerly XBMC)	Yes	Yes	Yes	Yes	Yes	Yes	No	No	No	No	No
xine	unmaintained	WIP for 1.2 series	No	No	Yes	Yes	Yes	Yes	No	No	No
sView	Yes	Yes	No	Yes	Yes	No	No	No	No	No	No
Video player	Windows	macOS	iOS	Android	Linux	BSD Unix	Solaris	Unix-like	DOS	BeOS, Haiku, ZETA	OS/2

== Features ==
Video player	Outbound streaming	Skinnable	Media database	Gapless audio decoding	Visualizer	Audio equalizer	Remote controllable	Intelligent playlists from database (based on criteria)	HDR video playback	Stereoscopic 3D Playback	360-degree video playback
ALLPlayer	Yes	Yes	Yes	No	Yes	?	Yes	Yes	?	?	?
Elmedia Player	Yes	No	No	No	Yes	Yes	Yes	No	No	No	No
Apprentice Video	No	No	No	Yes	No	?	only on OSX	No	?	?	?
DivX	Yes (DLNA)	No	Yes (limited)	No	No	No	No	No	No	No	Yes
GOM Player	Yes	Yes	No	No	No	?	Yes	No	No	?	Yes
iTunes	Yes	Partial (Note: Plugin available.)	Yes	Yes	Yes	?	Yes	Yes	?	?	?
jetAudio	Partial	Yes	Yes	Yes	Yes	?	Yes	?	?	?	?
JRiver Media Center	Yes	Yes	Yes	Yes	Yes	?	Yes	Yes	?	?	?
K-Multimedia Player	Yes	Yes	Yes	No	Yes	?	Yes	No	?	?	?
Mac Blu-ray Player	Yes	Yes	Yes	Yes	No	?	No	No	?	?	?
Media Player Classic Home Cinema	?	Yes	Yes	No	No	?	Yes	Yes	Yes	No	?
MediaPortal	Yes	Yes	Yes	Yes	Yes	?	Yes	Yes	?	?	?
MPlayer	Yes	Yes	No	No	No	?	Yes	No	No	?	No
mpv	Yes	Yes	No	Yes	No	?	Yes	No	Yes	?	No
Plex Media Player	Yes	Yes	Yes	No	No	?	Yes	No	?	?	?
PotPlayer	Yes	Yes	Yes	No	Yes	Yes	Yes	No	Yes	Yes	Yes
PowerDVD	?	Yes	No	?	Yes	?	?	No	?	No	?
QuickTime Player	Partial (Note: Available with QuickTime Streaming Server.)	Partial (Note: Only the media creator can create skins.)	No	Yes	No	?	Yes	No	?	?	?
RealPlayer	No	Yes	Yes	No	Yes	?	?	Yes	?	?	?
SMPlayer	?	Yes	No	?	?	?	?	No	?	?	?
GNOME Videos (formerly Totem)	No	No	No	No	Yes	?	No	No	?	?	?
VLC	Yes	Yes	yes, not macOS	No	Yes	Yes	Yes	No	Yes	Some (Note: anaglyph only)	?
Winamp	Partial	Yes	Yes	Yes	Yes	?	Partial	Yes (Note: Via media library in "modern" skin)	?	?	?
Windows Media Player	Yes	Yes	Yes	Yes	Yes	Yes	Yes	Yes	?	?	?
Kodi (formerly XBMC)	Yes (Note: Kodi/XBMC has a built-in UPnP AV MediaServer, FTP-server (based on FileZilla), and a web server (however the web-server is mainly designed for remote control and not for streaming, but it can be used for streaming with some small modifications any user can make))	Yes	Yes	Yes	Yes	?	Yes	Yes	?	?	?
xine	No	Yes	No	Yes	Yes	?	Yes	No	?	?	?
sView	No	No	No	Yes	No	?	? (WebUI)	No	No	Yes	Yes
Video player	Outbound streaming	Skinnable	Media database	Gapless audio decoding	Visualizer	Audio equalizer	Remote controllable	Intelligent playlists from database (based on criteria)	HDR video playback	Stereoscopic 3D Playback	360-degree video playback

=== Extended features ===
Video player	Color controls	Time stretching	Pitch shifting	A-B repeat	Seek bar preview tooltip	Interactive playback zoom	Audio resync	Subtitle resync	Chapter (DVD, mkv, mp4, ogm)	Bookmark (DVD, video, audio)	Auto resume (DVD, video, audio)	Shutdown on play complete
ALLPlayer	Yes	Yes	Yes	Yes	?	?	Yes	Yes	Yes	Yes	Yes	Yes
Elmedia Player	Yes	Yes	No	Yes	Yes	No	Yes	Yes	Yes	Yes	Yes	Yes
Apprentice Video	No	Yes	No	Yes	?	?	No	No	Yes	No	No	No
Banshee	?	No	No	?	No	?	?	?	?	Yes	?	?
DivX	No	No	No	No	No	No	No	No	No	No	Yes	No
FFplay	No	No	No	No	?	?	?	No	No	No	No	Yes
GOM Player	Yes	Yes	No	Yes	?	?	Yes	Yes	Yes	Yes	Yes	Yes
iTunes	No	Yes	No	No	?	?	No	No	Yes	Yes	Yes	No
jetAudio	Yes	?	Yes	Yes	?	?	?	Yes	Yes	Yes	Yes	Yes
JRiver Media Center	?	?	?	?	?	?	?	?	Yes	?	Yes	?
K-Multimedia Player	Yes	Yes	Yes	Yes	?	?	Yes	Yes	Yes	Some (Note: Bookmarks are limited to 20 files and are stored with absolute paths, which renders them inaccessible when files are moved)	Yes	Yes
Mac Blu-ray Player	No	No	No	No	No	?	No	No	No	No	No	No
Media Player Classic Home Cinema	Yes	Yes	Yes	Yes	Yes	?	Yes	Yes	Yes	Yes	Yes	Yes
MediaPortal	?	No	No	Yes	?	?	?	Yes	Yes	Yes	Yes	No
MPlayer	Yes	Yes	Yes (Note: Pitch-shifting and AB-Repeat are not included in Mplayer's interactive keyboard controls, but can be set up via command line parameters. Mplayer manual)	Yes	?	?	Yes	Yes	Partial	No	No	Yes
mpv	Yes	Yes	Yes	Yes	?	?	Yes	Yes	Partial	No	Yes	Yes
Plex Media Player	No	Yes	No	No	?	?	Yes	Yes	Yes	Yes	Yes	Yes
PotPlayer	Yes	Yes	Yes	Yes	Yes	?	Yes	Yes	Yes	Yes	Yes	Yes
PowerDVD	Yes	Yes	Yes	Yes	?	?	?	?	Yes	Yes	Yes	No
QuickTime Player	Yes	Yes	Yes	Yes (Note: www.apple.com/quicktime/pro/ - A-B repeat using Play Selection Only command)	?	?	?	?	Yes	?	?	No
RealPlayer	?	?	?	?	?	?	?	?	?	?	?	?
SMPlayer	Yes	Yes	Yes	Yes (Note: As of SVN 3349)	?	?	Yes	Yes	Partial	No	Yes	Yes
GNOME Videos (formerly Totem)	Yes	No	No	No	?	?	No	No	Yes	No	Yes	No
VLC	Yes	Yes	Yes	Yes	?	Yes	Yes	Yes	Yes	Yes	Yes (from 2.2)	Yes
Winamp	No	Yes	Yes	?	No	?	?	?	?	Yes	?	?
Windows Media Player	Yes	Yes	No	No	No	?	No	No	DVD only	No	Partial	Partial
WinDVD	Yes	Yes	Yes	Yes	?	?	?	?	Yes	No	Yes	?
Kodi (formerly XBMC)	Yes	No	No	No	?	?	Yes	Yes	Yes	Yes	Yes	Yes
xine	Yes	Audio plugin	No	No	?	?	Yes	Yes	Yes	No	No	Yes
sView	Yes	No	No	No	?	?	Yes	No	No	No	Yes	No
Video player	Color controls	Time stretching	Pitch shifting	A-B repeat	Seek bar preview tooltip	Interactive playback zoom	Audio resync	Subtitle resync	Chapter (DVD, mkv, mp4, ogm)	Bookmark (DVD, video, audio)	Auto resume (DVD, video, audio)	Shutdown on play complete

== Consumer video format ability ==
Information about what video formats the players understand. Footnotes lead to information about abilities of future versions of the players or plugins/filters that provide such abilities.

Video player	MPEG-1	MPEG-2	MPEG-4 Part 2 (ASP)	MPEG-4 Part 10 H.264 (AVC)	WMV	RealVideo	Theora	Flash	Dirac	VP8	VP9	HEVC (H.265)	Essential Video Coding (EVC/MPEG-5 Part 1)	AV1	Versatile Video Coding (VVC/H.266)	AV2
ALLPlayer	Yes	Yes	Yes	Yes	Yes	Yes	Yes	Yes	Yes	Yes	?	?	?	?	?	?
Elmedia Player	Yes	Yes	Yes	Yes	Yes	Yes	Yes	Partial (Supported on Intel Macs and partially on Apple Silicon via Rosetta)	Yes (supports the codec but not the DRC extension)	Yes	Yes	Yes	?	?	?	?
Apprentice Video	Yes	Yes	Yes	Yes	Yes	Yes	Yes	Yes	Yes	?	?	?	?	?	?	?
DivX	Yes	Yes	Yes	Yes	No	No	No	No	No	No	No	Yes	?	?	?	?
FFmpeg FFplay	Yes	Yes	Yes	Yes	Yes	Yes	Yes	Yes	Yes	Yes	Yes	Yes	No	Yes	Yes	No
GOM Player	Yes	Partial (Note: This format is supported out-of-the-box in Windows 7 and later. In Windows Vista and earlier, the playing compatibility depends on the availability of DirectShow filters.)	Yes	Partial (Note: The playing compatibility depends on the availability of DirectShow filters.)	Yes	Partial	Partial	Yes	Partial	Partial	Yes	Yes	?	?	?	?
iTunes	Yes	Partial (Note: The playing compatibility depends on the availability of MPEG2 component for QuickTime.)	Yes	Yes	Partial (Note: The playing compatibility depends on the availability of WMV Player component for QuickTime.)	No	Partial (Note: 3rd party plugins are available. The Xiph QuickTime Components allow any QuickTime application to parse Ogg files and play Vorbis, FLAC (Doesn't work with FLAC containers), Speex, and Theora.)	Partial (Note: On macOS, 3rd party plugins are available. The Perian QuickTime components for Mac OS X 10.4.7+ allow any QuickTime application to play a wide variety of formats.)	No	Partial	?	?	?	?	?	?
jetAudio	Yes	Partial	Partial	Partial	Yes	Partial	Partial	Yes	Partial	Yes	?	?	?	?	?	?
JRiver Media Center	Yes	Yes	Yes	Yes	Yes	Yes	Partial	Yes	Partial	Partial	?	Yes	?	?	?	?
K-Multimedia Player	Yes	Yes	Yes	Yes	Yes	Yes	Yes	Yes	Yes	Yes	?	?	?	?	?	?
Mac Blu-ray Player	Yes	Yes	Yes	Yes	Yes	Yes	Yes	Yes	Yes	No	?	?	?	?	?	?
Media Player Classic Home Cinema	Yes	Yes	Yes	Yes	Yes	Yes	Yes	Yes	Yes	Yes	Yes	Yes	?	Yes	?	?
MediaPortal	Yes	Yes	Yes	Yes	Yes	Yes	Yes	Yes	Yes	Yes	?	?	?	?	?	?
Microsoft Movies & TV	Yes	Yes	Yes	Yes	Yes	?	?	?	?	?	?	?	?	?	?	?
MPlayer	Yes	Yes	Yes	Yes	Yes	Yes	Yes	Yes	Yes	Yes	Yes	Yes	?	Yes	?	?
mpv	Yes	Yes	Yes	Yes	Yes	Yes	Yes	Yes	Yes	Yes	Yes	Yes	?	Yes	?	?
Plex Media Player	Yes	Yes	Yes	Yes	Yes	Yes	Yes	Yes	Yes	?	?	?	?	?	?	?
PotPlayer	Yes	Yes	Yes	Yes	Yes	Yes	Yes	Yes	Yes	Yes	Yes	Yes	?	?	?	?
QuickTime Player	Yes	Partial	Yes	Yes	Partial	No	Partial	Partial	No	Partial	?	?	?	?	?	?
RealPlayer	Yes	Yes	Partial	Partial	Yes	Yes	Partial	Yes	Partial	Partial	?	?	?	?	?	?
SMPlayer	Yes	Yes	Yes	Yes	Yes	Yes	Yes	Yes	Yes	Yes	?	?	?	Yes	?	?
GNOME Videos (formerly Totem)	Yes (Note: Available via Gstreamer plugin.)	Yes	Yes	Yes	Yes	Yes	Yes	Yes	Yes	Yes	Yes	?	?	?	?	?
VLC	Yes	Yes	Yes	Yes	Yes	Yes	Yes	Yes	Yes	Yes	Yes	Yes	?	Yes	?	?
Winamp	Yes	Partial	Partial	Partial	Yes	Partial	Partial	Yes	Partial	Yes	?	?	?	?	?	?
Windows Media Player	Yes	Yes	Yes (Note: This format is supported out-of-the-box in Windows Media Player 12 and later (which requires Windows 7 or later). In Windows Media Player 11 and earlier, the playing compatibility depends on the availability of DirectShow filters.)	Yes	Yes	Partial	Partial	Partial	Partial	Partial (Note: The playing compatibility depends on the availability of DirectShow filters, or in the case of Windows Media Player 12 and above, there is also the option of using Microsoft Media Foundation components, which have the added bonus of adding WebM support through the HTML5 <video> element to Internet Explorer 9 or later.)	?	?	?	?	?	?
Kodi (formerly XBMC)	Yes	Yes	Yes	Yes	Yes	Yes	Yes	Yes	Yes	Yes	Yes	Yes	?	Yes	?	?
xine	Yes	Yes	Yes	Yes	Yes	Yes	Yes	Yes	?	?	?	?	?	Yes	?	?
sView	Yes	Yes	Yes	Yes	Yes	Yes	Yes	Yes	Yes	Yes	Yes	Yes	?	?	?	?
Video player	MPEG-1	MPEG-2	MPEG-4 Part 2 (ASP)	MPEG-4 Part 10 H.264 (AVC)	WMV	RealVideo	Theora	Flash	Dirac	VP8	VP9	HEVC (H.265)	EVC/MPEG-5 Part 1	AV1	VVC (H.266)	AV2

== Production video format ability ==
Video player	MPEG-4 SStP	AVC-Intra	AVC-Ultra	XAVC	Apple ProRes	VC-2 /Dirac Pro	VC-3 /Avid DNxHD	VC-5 /GoPro CineForm	Redcode RAW	ARRIRAW	CinemaDNG	Cineon /DPX sequence	OpenEXR sequence	TIFF sequence	PNG sequence	JPEG sequence	JPEG 2000 sequence
FFplay	Yes	Yes	No	Yes	Yes	Yes	Yes	Yes	Some	No	No	Yes	Some	Some	Yes	Yes	Yes
MPlayer	?	Yes	No	Yes	Yes	Yes	Yes	Yes	Some	No	No	Yes	Some	Some	Yes	Yes	Yes
VLC	?	Yes	No	?	Yes	Yes	Yes	?	?	No	No	Yes	?	Some	Yes	Yes	Yes

== Audio format ability ==
Information about what audio formats the players understand. Footnotes lead to information about abilities of future versions of the players or plugins/filters that provide such abilities.

Video player	Lossy compression								Lossless compression				
Video player	MP3	WMA	RealAudio	Vorbis	Musepack	AAC	AC-3	Opus	APE	FLAC	ALAC	SHN	WV
ALLPlayer	Yes	Yes	Yes	Yes	Yes	Yes	Yes	?	Yes	Yes	Yes	Yes	Yes
Elmedia Player	Yes	Yes	Yes	Yes	Yes (Supports the codec but not the MPC extension)	Yes	Yes	Yes	Yes	Yes	Yes	Yes (supports the codec, but not the .shn file extension)	Yes (Supports the codec but not the WV extension)
Apprentice Video	Yes	Yes	Yes	Yes	Yes	Yes	Yes	?	Yes	Yes	Yes	Yes	Yes
DivX	Yes	No	No	No	No	Yes	Yes	No	No	No	No	No	No
FFplay	Yes	Yes	Yes	Yes	Yes	Yes	Yes	Yes	Yes	Yes	Yes	Yes	Yes
GOM Player	Yes	Yes	Yes	Yes	No	Yes	Yes	Yes	No	No	No	No	No
iTunes	Yes	yes, no DRM	No	Partial	No	Yes	No	?	No	Partial	Yes	No	No
jetAudio	Yes	Yes	Yes	Yes	Yes	Yes	Yes	?	Yes	Yes	No	No	Yes
JRiver Media Center	Yes	Yes	Yes	Yes	Yes	Yes	Yes	Yes	Yes	Yes	Yes	Yes	Yes
K-Multimedia Player	Yes	Yes	Yes	Yes	Yes	Yes	Yes	Partial	Yes	Yes	Yes	Partial	Yes
Mac Blu-ray Player	Yes	Yes	Yes	Yes	Yes	Yes	?	?	?	?	?	?	?
Media Player Classic Home Cinema	Yes	Yes	Yes	Yes	Yes	Yes	Yes	Yes	Yes	Yes	Yes	Yes	Yes
MediaPortal	Yes	Yes	Yes	Yes	Yes	Yes	Yes	?	Yes	Yes	Yes	Yes	Yes
MPlayer	Yes	Yes	Yes	Yes	Yes	Yes	Yes	Yes	Yes	Yes	Yes	Yes	Yes
mpv	Yes	Yes	Yes	Yes	Yes	Yes	Yes	Yes	Yes	Yes	Yes	Yes	Yes
Plex Media Player	Yes	Yes	Yes	Yes	Yes	Yes	Yes	?	Yes	Yes	Yes	Yes	Yes
PotPlayer	Yes	Yes	Yes	Yes	Yes	Yes	Yes	Yes	Yes	Yes	Yes	Yes	Yes
QuickTime Player	Yes	Partial	No	Partial	No	Yes	Partial	?	No	Partial	Yes	No	No
RealPlayer	Yes	Yes	Yes	Partial	No	Yes	No	?	No	No	No	No	No
SMPlayer	Yes	Yes	Yes	Yes	Yes	Yes	Yes	?	Yes	Yes	Yes	Yes	Yes
GNOME Videos (formerly Totem)	Yes	Yes	Yes	Yes	Yes	Yes	Yes	Yes	Yes	Yes	Yes	Yes	Yes
VLC	Yes	Yes	Partial	Yes	Yes	Yes	Yes	Yes	Yes	Yes	Yes	Yes	Yes
Winamp	Yes	Yes	Partial	Yes	Partial	Yes	Partial	Partial	Partial	Yes	Partial	Partial	Partial
Windows Media Player	Yes	Yes	Partial	Partial	Partial	Partial	Partial	Partial	Partial	Partial	Partial	Partial	Partial
Kodi (formerly XBMC)	Yes	Yes	Yes	Yes	Yes	Yes	Yes	Yes	Yes	Yes	Yes	Yes	Yes
xine	Yes	Yes	Yes	Yes	Yes	Yes	Yes	?	No	Yes	Yes	Yes	Yes
sView	Yes	Yes	Yes	Yes	Yes	Yes	Yes	Yes	Yes	Yes	Yes	Yes	Yes
Video player	MP3	WMA	RealAudio	Vorbis	Musepack	AAC	AC-3	Opus	APE	FLAC	ALAC	SHN	WV

== Container format ability ==
Information about what container formats the players understand. Footnotes lead to information about abilities of future versions of the players or filters that provide such abilities.

Video player	AVI	ASF	QuickTime	Ogg	OGM	Matroska	MP4	NUT	FLV	WebM
ALLPlayer	Yes	Yes	Yes	Yes	Yes	Yes	Yes	Yes	Yes	?
Elmedia Player	Yes	Yes	Yes	Yes	Yes	Yes	Yes	Yes	Yes	Yes
Apprentice Video	Yes	Yes	Yes	Yes	Yes	Yes	Yes	Yes	Yes	?
DivX	Yes	No	No	No	No	Yes	Yes	No	No	No
FFplay	Yes	Yes	Yes	Yes	Yes	Yes	Yes	Yes	Yes	Yes
GOM Player	Yes	Yes	Yes	Vorbis only	Yes	Yes	Yes	No	Yes	Yes
iTunes	No	Windows: yes macOS: file is parsable	Yes	Partial	No	No	Yes	?	?	?
jetAudio	Yes	Yes	Partial	Vorbis only	Yes	Yes	Partial	?	?	Yes
JRiver Media Center	Yes	Yes	Yes	Yes	Yes	Yes	Yes	?	Yes	?
K-Multimedia Player	Yes	Yes	Yes	Yes	Yes	Yes	Yes	Yes	Yes	?
Mac Blu-ray Player	Yes	Yes	Yes	Yes	Yes	Yes	Yes	?	Yes	?
Media Player Classic Home Cinema	Yes	Yes	Yes	Yes	Yes	Yes	Yes	Yes	Yes	Yes
MediaPortal	Yes	Yes	Yes	Yes	Yes	Yes	Yes	Yes	Yes	?
Microsoft Movies & TV (formerly Xbox Video)	Yes	Yes	Yes	No	?	Yes	Yes	?	No	?
MPlayer	Yes	Yes	Yes	Yes	Yes	Yes	Yes	Yes	Yes	Yes
mpv	Yes	Yes	Yes	Yes	Yes	Yes	Yes	Yes	Yes	Yes
Plex Media Player	Yes	Yes	Yes	Yes	Yes	Yes	Yes	?	Yes	?
PotPlayer	Yes	Yes	Yes	Yes	Yes	Yes	Yes	?	Yes	Yes
QuickTime Player	Yes	Partial	Yes	Partial	No	Yes	Yes	?	Yes	Yes
RealPlayer	Yes	Yes	Yes	Partial	Partial	No	Yes	?	?	?
GNOME Videos (formerly Totem)	Yes	Yes	Yes	Yes	Yes	Yes	Yes	?	Yes	Yes
VLC	Yes	Yes	Yes	Yes	Yes	Yes	Yes	Yes	Yes	Yes
Winamp	Yes	Yes	Partial	Vorbis only	Partial	Partial	Yes	?	?	Yes
Windows Media Player	Yes	Yes	WMP12 Yes	Partial	Partial	Partial	WMP12 Yes	?	Yes	?
Kodi (formerly XBMC)	Yes	Yes	Yes	Yes	Yes	Yes	Yes	Yes	Yes	Yes
xine	Yes	Yes	Yes	Yes	Yes	Yes	Yes	?	Yes	?
sView	Yes	Yes	Yes	Yes	Yes	Yes	Yes	Yes	Yes	Yes
Video player	AVI	ASF	QuickTime	Ogg	OGM	Matroska	MP4	NUT	FLV	WebM

== Streaming support ==
Information about which protocols the players understand, for receiving streaming media content.

Video player	HTTP	HTTPS	HLS	DASH	HDS	Smooth	FTP	SFTP	RTSP RTSPU/RTSPT	MMS MMSU/MMST	RTMP	Podcast	RDT/RealRTSP	RTP	DAAP	DLNA
ALLPlayer	?	?	?	?	?	?	?	?	?	?	?	?	?	?	?	?
Elmedia Player	Yes	Yes	Yes	No	No	No	No	No	No	No	No	No	No	No	No	No
Amarok	Yes	?	?	?	?	?	?	?	Yes	Yes	?	Yes	?	?	Yes	?
Apprentice Video	Yes	No	Partial	?	?	?	No	?	Yes	Yes	Yes	No	No	Yes	No	No
DivX	No	No	Yes	No	No	No	No	No	No	No	No	No	No	No	No	Yes
FFplay	Yes	Yes	Yes	Yes	patch available	No	Yes	Yes	Yes	Yes	Yes	No	Yes	Yes	No	No
GOM Player	Yes	Yes	Yes	?	?	?	?	?	No	Yes	?	No	?	Yes	?	?
iTunes	Yes	?	?	?	?	?	?	?	Yes	No	?	Yes	?	?	Yes	?
jetAudio	Yes	?	?	?	?	?	?	?	No	?	?	?	?	?	?	?
JRiver Media Center	Yes	?	?	?	?	?	?	?	?	?	?	Yes	?	?	?	Yes
K-Multimedia Player	Yes	?	?	?	?	?	?	?	Yes	Yes	?	No	?	?	?	?
Media Player Classic Home Cinema	Yes	Yes	Yes	Yes	No	Yes	?	?	Yes	Yes	Yes	No	?	Yes	?	?
MediaPortal	Yes	Yes	?	?	?	?	Yes	?	?	Yes	?	?	?	Yes	?	?
MPlayer	Yes	?	?	?	?	?	Yes	?	Yes	Yes	No	Yes	?	Yes	?	?
mpv	Yes	Yes	Yes	Yes	?	?	Yes	?	Yes	Yes	No	Yes	?	Yes	?	?
PotPlayer	Yes	Yes	Yes	Yes	Yes	Yes	Yes	No	Yes	Yes	Yes	Yes	Yes	Yes	Yes	Yes
QuickTime Player	Yes	?	?	?	?	?	?	?	Yes	No	?	Yes	?	?	?	?
RealPlayer	Yes	?	?	?	?	?	?	?	Yes	Yes	?	Yes	?	?	?	?
GNOME Videos (formerly Totem)	Yes	Yes	Yes	Yes	?	?	Yes	?	Yes	Yes	Yes	No	?	Yes	Yes	Yes
VLC	Yes	Yes	Yes	Yes	Yes	Yes	Yes	Yes	Yes	Yes	Yes	Yes	Yes	Yes	Yes	Yes
Winamp	Yes	?	?	?	?	?	?	?	No	Yes	?	Yes	?	?	?	?
Windows Media Player	Yes	?	?	?	?	?	?	?	Yes	Dropped (WMP10)	?	Yes	?	?	?	Yes
Kodi (formerly XBMC)	Yes	Yes	Yes	?	?	?	Yes	?	Yes	Yes	Yes	Yes	Yes	Yes	Yes	Yes
xine	Yes	?	?	?	?	?	?	?	Yes	Yes	?	No	?	?	?	?
sView	Yes	Yes	Yes	No	No	No	?	?	?	?	?	No	?	?	No	No
Video player	HTTP	HTTPS	HLS	DASH	HDS	Smooth	FTP	SFTP	RTSP	MMS	RTMP	Podcast	RDT/RealRTSP	RTP	DAAP	DLNA

== Playlist format ability ==
Information about which playlist formats the players understand.

Video player	asx/wax/wvx	m3u/m3u8	pls	xspf	ram/rmm	sdp	rpl	xpl	bdmv	wmx
ALLPlayer	No	Yes	Yes	?	?	?	?	?	?	?
Elmedia Player	No	Yes	No	No	No	No	No	No	Partial (Please note in the footnote that the navigation is not working)	No
Apprentice Video	No	No	No	No	No	No	No	No	No	No
DivX	No	No	No	No	No	No	No	No	No	No
FFplay	No	No	No	No	No	No	No	No	?	?
GOM Player	ASX support	?	Yes	?	?	?	?	?	?	
iTunes	No	No	No	No	?	?	?	?	?	?
jetAudio	?	Yes	Yes	?	?	?	?	?	?	?
JRiver Media Center	Yes	Yes	Yes	?	?	?	?	?	?	?
K-Multimedia Player	Yes	Yes	Yes	?	Yes	?	?	?	?	?
Mac Blu-ray Player	?	?	?	?	?	?	?	?	?	?
Media Player Classic Home Cinema	Yes	Yes	Yes	Yes	Yes	No	No	No	Yes	Yes
MediaPortal	?	Yes	Yes	?	?	?	?	?	?	?
MPlayer	Yes	Yes	Yes	No	?	?	?	?	?	?
mpv	No	Yes	Yes	No	?	?	?	?	?	?
PotPlayer	Yes	Yes	Yes	Yes	Yes	No	No	No	No	Yes
QuickTime Player	?	?	?	?	?	?	?	?	?	?
RealPlayer	Yes	Yes	Yes	?	Yes	Yes	Yes	Yes	?	?
GNOME Videos (formerly Totem)	Yes	Yes	Yes	Yes	Yes	Yes	?	?	?	?
VLC	Yes	Yes	Yes	Yes	Yes	Yes	?	?	Yes	?
Winamp	Yes	Yes	Yes	Yes	?	?	?	?	?	?
Windows Media Player	Yes	Yes	No	?	?	?	?	?	?	?
Kodi (formerly XBMC)	Yes	Yes	Yes	Yes	Yes	Yes	?	?	Yes	Yes
xine	?	?	?	?	?	?	?	?	?	?
sView	No	Yes	No	No	No	No	No	No	No	No
Video player	asx/wax/wvx	m3u/m3u8	pls	xspf	ram/rmm	sdp	rpl	xpl	bdmv	wmx

== Electronic program guide format ability ==
Information about which Electronic program guide format the players viewable.

Video player	PSI EIT	PSIP	XMLTV
ALLPlayer	?	?	?
Elmedia Player	No	No	No
Apprentice Video	?	?	?
FFplay	No	No	No
DivX	No	No	No
GOM Player	?	?	?
iTunes	?	?	?
jetAudio	?	?	?
JRiver Media Center	?	?	?
K-Multimedia Player	?	?	?
Mac Blu-ray Player	?	?	?
Media Player Classic Home Cinema	?	?	?
MediaPortal	?	?	?
MPlayer	No	No	?
mpv	No	No	?
PotPlayer	Yes	Yes	No
QuickTime Player	?	?	?
RealPlayer	?	?	?
GNOME Videos (formerly Totem)	?	?	?
VLC	Yes	Yes	?
Winamp	?	?	?
Windows Media Player	?	?	?
Kodi (formerly XBMC)	Partial	?	Partial
xine	?	?	?
sView	No	No	No
Video player	PSI EIT	PSIP	XMLTV

== Subtitle ability ==
Information about what subtitle formats the players understand. Footnotes lead to information about abilities of future versions of the players or filters that provide such abilities.

Video player	Text													Bitmap			
Video player	SubRip (.srt)	SubStation Alpha (.ssa+.ass)	MicroDVD (.sub)	SAMI (.smi)	SubViewer (.sub)	RealText (.rt)	Text file (.txt)	Universal Subtitle Format (.usf)	Closed captioning	MPEG-4 Part 17	SCTE-27	TTML/ SMPTE-TT	WebVTT (.vtt)	VobSub (.idx+.sub)	XSUB (.divx embedded subtitles)	DVD subtitles	DVB subtitles
ALLPlayer	Yes	Yes	Yes	Yes	Yes	Yes	No	No	?	?	?	?	?	Yes	Yes	?	?
Elmedia Player	Yes	Yes	Yes	Yes	Yes	Yes	Yes	No	Yes	Yes	No	No	Yes	Yes	Yes	Yes	Yes
Apprentice Video	Yes (Note: Subtitles stored separately from the media file are not supported.)	Yes	No	No	No	No	No	No	No	?	?	?	?	Yes	Yes	Yes	Yes
FFplay	Yes (Note: only if FFmpeg was built with libass and 'subtitles' video filter.)	Yes	Yes	Yes	Yes	Yes	Yes	No	Yes	Yes	No	No	?	Yes	Yes	Yes	Yes
GOM Player	Yes	Partial (Note: This player understands some of the formatting data from SSA/ASS (at most coloring but no positioning, animation, typesetting etc.), but some players could understand the rest of it by using DirectVobSub as external subtitle filter instead of the built-in one.)	Yes	Yes	No	Yes	No	No	?	?	?	?	Yes	Yes	No	Yes	?
iTunes	No	No	No	No	No	No	No	No	No	?	?	?	?	No	No	No	No
jetAudio	Yes	Partial	Yes	No	?	No	Yes	Yes	Yes	?	?	?	?	Yes	No	Yes	?
JRiver Media Center	Yes	Yes	Yes	Yes	Yes	Yes	Yes	Yes	?	?	?	?	?	Yes	Yes	Yes	Yes
K-Multimedia Player	Yes	Yes	Yes	Yes	Yes	Yes	Yes	Yes	?	?	?	?	?	Yes	Yes	?	?
Mac Blu-ray Player	?	?	?	?	?	?	?	?	?	?	?	?	?	?	?	?	?
Media Player Classic Home Cinema	Yes	Yes	Yes	Yes	Yes	Yes	Yes	Yes	Yes	Yes	?	?	Yes	Yes	Yes	Yes	Yes
MediaPortal	Yes	Yes	Yes	Yes	Yes	Yes	Yes	Yes	Yes	?	?	?	?	Yes	Yes	Yes	Yes
MPlayer	Yes	Yes	Yes	Yes	Yes	Yes	No	No	Yes	?	?	?	?	Yes	Yes	Yes	Yes
PotPlayer	Yes	Yes	Yes	Yes	Yes	Yes	Yes	Yes	Yes	Yes	?	?	Yes	Yes	Yes	Yes	Yes
QuickTime Player	Yes	Yes	No	No	No	No	No	No	?	?	?	?	?	No	No	?	?
RealPlayer	Yes	No	Yes	Yes	?	Yes	Yes	No	?	?	?	?	?	Yes	No	?	?
GNOME Videos (formerly Totem)	Yes	Partial	?	No	?	No	?	No	?	?	?	?	?	Yes	No	?	?
VLC	Yes	Yes	Yes	Yes	Yes	Yes	Yes	Yes	Yes	Yes	Yes	Some	Yes	Yes	Yes	Yes	Yes
Winamp	Yes (Note: For Windows, the ability to use many subtitle formats can be added by installing DirectVobSub or ffdshow.)	Yes	Yes	Yes	No	No	Yes	Yes	?	?	?	?	?	Yes	Yes	?	?
Windows Media Player	Yes	Yes	Yes	Yes	No	No	Yes	Yes	?	?	?	?	?	Yes	Yes	?	?
Kodi (formerly XBMC)	Yes	Yes	Yes	Yes	Yes	Yes	Yes	No	Yes	?	?	?	?	Yes	Yes	Yes	Yes
xine	Yes	Partial	Yes	Yes	Yes	No	Yes	No	?	?	?	?	?	Yes	No	?	?
sView	Yes	Yes	Yes	Yes	Yes	Yes	No	No	Yes	Yes	No	No	?	Yes	Yes	Yes	Yes
Video player	SubRip (.srt)	SubStation Alpha (.ssa+.ass)	MicroDVD (.sub)	SAMI (.smi)	SubViewer (.sub)	RealText (.rt)	Text file (.txt)	Universal Subtitle Format (.usf)	Closed captioning	MPEG-4 Part 17	SCTE-27	TTML/ SMPTE-TT	WebVTT (.vtt)	VobSub (.idx+.sub)	XSUB (.divx embedded subtitles)	DVD subtitles	DVB subtitles

== Metadata ability ==
Information about what metadata, or tagging, formats the players understand. Most other containers have their own metadata format and the players usually use them. Footnotes lead to information about abilities of future versions of the players or plugins that provide such abilities.

Video player	ID3v1	ID3v2	APEv2 tag	Vorbis comment	AMF	ASF metadata	MOV metadata	Cue sheet	CD-Text
ALLPlayer	Yes	Yes	No	No	?	?	?	No	No
Elmedia Player	Yes	Yes	Yes	Yes	Yes	Yes	Yes	Yes	No
Apprentice Video	Yes	Yes	Yes	Yes	Yes	Yes	Yes	No	No
FFplay	Yes	Yes	Yes	Yes	Yes	Yes	Yes	patch available	No
GOM Player	No	No	No	No	?	?	?	?	?
iTunes	Yes	Yes	No	?	?	?	Yes	?	Yes
jetAudio	Yes	Yes	Yes	Yes	?	?	?	Partial (Note: Supports via plugin available in Cowon Forums)	?
JRiver Media Center	Yes	Yes	Yes	Yes	?	?	?	Yes	Yes
K-Multimedia Player	Yes	Yes	Yes	Yes	?	?	?	Yes	Yes
Mac Blu-ray Player	?	?	?	?	?	?	?	?	?
Media Player Classic Home Cinema	Yes	Yes	Yes	Yes	?	Yes	Yes	Yes	?
MediaPortal	Yes	Yes	Yes	?	?	?	?	?	?
MPlayer	Yes	Yes	Yes	Yes	Yes	Yes	Yes	Partial (Note: MPlayer can read .cue files with cue:// type URL, but has problems, see Talk:Cue sheet (computing)#mplayer have more faults)	?
PotPlayer	Yes	Yes	Yes	?	?	?	?	Yes	?
QuickTime Player	Yes	?	?	?	?	?	?	?	?
RealPlayer	Yes	Yes	?	No	?	?	?	Yes	
GNOME Videos (formerly Totem)	Yes	Yes	Yes	Yes	?	Yes	Yes	?	?
VLC	Yes	Yes	Yes	Yes	Yes	Yes	Yes	Partial	Yes
Winamp	Yes	Yes	Partial (Note: Winamp relies on the tagging of its decoder. Replacing the standard decoder with an APEv2 capable one is possible.)	Yes	?	?	?	Partial	Yes
Windows Media Player	Yes	Partial (Note: ID3 V2.4 not supported (even on Windows Media Player 12).)	?	Partial	?	Yes	?	No	Partial
Kodi (formerly XBMC)	Yes	Yes	Yes	Yes	No	No	No	Yes	Partial
xine	Yes	Partial (Note: Displays basic ID3v1 / ID3v2 / Ogg Vorbis tags)	?	Yes	?	?	?	?	?
sView	Yes	Yes	Yes	Yes	Yes	Yes	Yes	No	No
Video player	ID3v1	ID3v2	APEv2 tag	Vorbis comment	AMF	ASF metadata	MOV metadata	Cue sheet	CD-Text

== Optical media ability ==
Information about what kinds of optical discs the players can play. Footnotes lead to information about abilities of future versions of the players or plugins that provide such abilities. Playback of Super Audio CD is not possible for any media player, because no suitable hardware exists. All media players capable of audio CD playback will also play the Redbook core of any HDCD disc, providing no sound-quality benefits over standard audio CDs.

	Audio				Video					
Video player	CD	DVD-Audio	HDCD	Super Audio CD (SACD)	Video CD (VCD)	SVCD	DVD	Blu-ray Disc	HD DVD	UHD BD
ALLPlayer	Yes	?	?	?	?	No	Yes	?	?	
Elmedia Player	Yes	Partial (without menu & navigation)	No	Yes	Yes	Yes	Partial (without menu & navigation)	Partial (Commercial BDs unsupported)	No	Partial (Commercial BDs unsupported)
Apprentice Video	No	No	No	?	No	No	No	No	No	
FFplay	via libcdio	No	via libcdio (Note: A built-in hdcd audio filter is available but needs to manually enable via commandline option.)	?	No	No	No	via libbluray	No	
GOM Player	Yes	No	No	?	Yes	Yes	Yes	No	?	
iTunes	Yes	No	No	?	No	No	No	No	No	
jetAudio	Yes	No	No	?	Yes	Yes	Yes	No	No	
JRiver Media Center	Yes	No	No	?	Yes	Yes	Yes	Yes	?	
K-Multimedia Player	Yes	No	No	?	Yes	Yes	Yes	No	No	
Media Player Classic Home Cinema	Yes	Yes	Yes	?	Yes	Yes	Yes	Commercial BDs unsupported	Yes	
MediaPortal	Yes	Yes	Yes	?	Yes	Yes	Yes	No (Note: Non-commercial BDs supported through plug-in, see this thread on team-mediaportal.com)	?	
MPlayer	Yes	No	No	?	Yes	Yes	Yes	No	No	
PotPlayer	Yes	Yes	No	?	Yes	Yes	Yes	Yes	No	
PowerDVD	Yes	No longer supported	?	?	Yes	Yes	Yes	Yes	No longer supported	Yes, limited
QuickTime Player	Yes	Yes	Yes	?	Yes	No (Note: See VCD and SVCD players on The X Lab)	Yes	No	No	
RealPlayer	Yes	No	No	?	Yes	Yes	Yes	No	No	
GNOME Videos (formerly Totem)	Yes	No	No	?	Yes	Yes	Yes	No	No	
VLC	Yes	Yes (Note: DVD Audio files are playable in VLC 1.1)	No	?	Yes	Partial (Note: See VLC playback Features at videolan.org.)	Yes	Commercial BDs unsupported	Yes (Note: HD-DVD .evo (H.264, VC-1, MPEG-2, PCM, AC-3, E-AC3, MLP, DTS) from version 3.0.0)	
Winamp	Yes	No	Yes	?	No	No	No	No	No	
Windows Media Player	Yes	Yes	Yes	?	Yes	Yes	Yes	No	No	
Kodi (formerly XBMC)	Yes	No	No	?	Partial (Note: VCD menu and SVCD menus are not supported nor displayed.)	Partial	Yes	Commercial BDs unsupported	?	
xine	Yes	No	No	?	Yes	Yes	Yes	No	No	
WinDVD	Yes	?	?	?	Yes	Yes	Yes	Yes	No	
sView	No	No	No	No	No	No	No	No	No	
Video player	CD	DVD-Audio	HDCD	Super Audio CD (SACD)	Video CD (VCD)	SVCD	DVD	Blu-ray Disc	HD DVD	UHD BD

== See also ==
- List of codecs
- Open source codecs and containers
- Comparison of video codecs
- Comparison of audio coding formats
- Comparison of video container formats
- Subtitles
- Comparison of DVR software packages

Related lists on other projects

- Open Source Toolset - short sections on Audio editing and Video editing
- Software - short lists of Ogg audio and video editors
- Help:Converting video - tools for manipulating audio and video
