= KMPlayer =

Freeware media player for Microsoft Windows

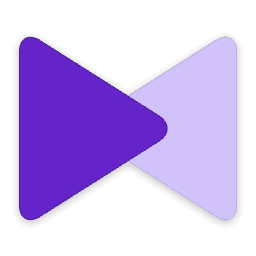
- Original author: Kang Yong-Huee
- Developer: Pandora TV
- Initial release: 1 October 2002; 23 years ago
- Written in: Delphi, C++Builder, Netwide Assembler and Visual C++
- Operating system: Windows 10 and later; OS X 10.6 or later; Android 7.0 or later; iOS 13 or later
- Available in: English, Afrikaans, Amharic, Arabic, Bulgarian, Catalan, Croatian, Czech, Danish, Dutch, Estonian, Finnish, French, German, Greek, Hebrew, Hindi, Hungarian, Indonesian, Italian, Japanese, Korean, Latvian, Lithuanian, Malay, Norwegian Bokmål, Persian, Polish, Portuguese, Romanian, Russian, Simplified Chinese, Slovak, Slovenian, Spanish, Swahili, Thai, Traditional Chinese, Turkish, Ukrainian, Vietnamese, Zulu
- Type: Media player
- License: Adware
- Website: kmplayer.com

K-Multimedia Player (commonly known as The KMPlayer, KMPlayer or KMP) is an Adware-supported media player for Windows, android and iOS that can play most current audio and video formats, including VCD, DVD, AVI, MP4, MPG, DAT, OGM, VOB, MKV, Ogg, OGM, 3GP, MPEG-1/2/4, AAC, WMA 7/8, WMV, RealMedia, FLV, and QuickTime.

== History ==
The original KMPlayer logo

The KMPlayer logo, effective 19 March 2012

KMPlayer was developed by Kang Yong-Huee (Korean: 강용희) and was officially released on 1 October 2002. On 5 March 2008, The KMPlayer's Forum announced that KMPlayer had been acquired by Pandora TV, a Korean streaming video company, in August 2007.

=== Naming ===
KMPlayer has had several names. In version 3.0.0.1438, the player was labeled both KMPlayer and KMP. The About page has referred to "The KMPlayer Professional Media Player" and "The KMPlayer". The version page has referred to "KMPlayer". The license page states:

Introduction of the KMP KMPlayer (Hereinafter, which is usually referred to as KMP) : KMP is a freeware software. Its real name is K-Multimedia Player. But, it is also called as KMP, KMPlayer or simply KMP Player.

== Subtitles ==
- Unicode text subtitles.
- SAMI (.sami, .smi): Ruby tag support.
- SubRipText (.srt), MicroDVD (.sub), SMIL/RealText.
- SSA, ASS, USF (Ruby support).
- VobSub, closed captions.
- Sasami 2K (S2k).
- Embedded subtitles of ASF, MKV, OGM, MP4, MOV, VOB, 3GP.
- Text-to-speech for reading subtitles.
- Supports that can have up to three sets of subtitles simultaneously.

== Reception ==
In 2012, Lifehacker listed KMPlayer as "one of the best multimedia players in the world".

Seth Rosenblatt of CNET's Download.com also rated KMPlayer 3.0 a score of 5 out of 5, stating that "it is one of the most powerful and excellent freeware video players we've seen. If you want to stream videos then I highly recommend KMPlayer", but it had mentioned a lack of online help or documentation as being a shortcoming.

Tina Sieber, writing for MakeUseOf (MUO), comments that "It natively supports a wide range of audio and video formats … it has many advanced features, it is extremely customizable, and it can be available in multiple languages", "If you want to look for a more versatile multimedia player for Windows, KMPlayer may be just the one for you.", "The KMPlayer interface is almost simple enough for most of the average people to be able to use it as a basic and affordable media player."

As of the third quarter of 2024, KMPlayer had over 21 million global users and exceeded 1.5 billion video plays per month.

== See also ==
- GOM Player
- PotPlayer
- Comparison of video player software
- Comparison of audio player software
