= Cdigix =

Former digital media provider

- Type: Private
- Founded: 2002
- Headquarters: Seattle, Washington, U.S.
- Key people: Larry Jacobson Chairman and Chief Executive Officer, Brett Goldberg Founder, Mark Brodsky VP of Sales, Anthony Ravani Sr VP of Technology, Diane Hager Chief Financial Officer
- Products: C-Labs
- Website: Cdigix.com

Cdigix, formerly known as Cflix, was a digital media provider for institutions of higher education. The company ceased operations at the end of 2008, citing the difficult economic times. It was, at one time, an online music store, serving as a content provider for college students. Their software allowed students to access media such as recorded lectures, podcasts, and educational films from any computer with an internet connection.

== History ==
Cdigix was founded initially as Cflix, a college campus test pilot for major studio movie rentals. The company soon shifted gears to a music subscription service and later "introduced" the online movie service featuring video content from major studios and distributors. In 2002, Cdigix launched the music subscription service Ctrax as a response to the widespread illicit file sharing on college campuses. This coincided with the record and film industries' campaigns against such actions. Starting with Duke University, Cdigix eventually provided 75 universities and colleges music service for their students. At one point, Ctrax carried more than two million songs from every major label. Due to Cdigix servers being deployed within campus networks and the introduction of fiber enhanced school networks, on-campus downloads were blazingly fast. Complaints about the lack of iPod support from college students led to a waning interest in the service as the iPod gained mass distribution. On the contrary, student owners of Microsoft compatible MP3 players often responded positively.

Cdigix "quietly ceased operations" at the end of December 2008, with a "lack of clients and an inability to raise money to continue" as its main reasons for dissolving. The president and COO of Cdigix, Mark Brodsky (now at Deltak edu), also mentioned the poor economic situation playing a large factor in the company's decision to end all operations.

== Media Player ==
Ctrax Media Player
- The main screen of the Ctrax Media Player under Windows XP
- Developer: Cdigix
- Final release: 2.0.20 / November 2006
- Operating system: Windows
- Type: Media Player
- License: Proprietary
- Website: www.cdigix.com

In October 2006, Cdigix launched the Cdigix Media Player, which represented a shift away from a web-based music store to a software based model. The Cdigix Media Player was based on JRiver Media Center and allowed subscribers to download and play music. The player and subsequently the service faced criticisms on several points including the size of the library when compared to competitors like Apple's iTunes Store, media having to be periodically renewed, poor support for external devices, stringent digital rights management, and incompatibility with certain operating systems.
