= PLS (file format) =

Multimedia playlist file format

Playlist
- Filename extension: .pls
- Internet media type: audio/x-scpls
- Type of format: Playlist

PLS is a computer file format for a multimedia playlist. It is typically used by media players for streaming media over the Internet, but may also be used for playing local media.

For online streaming, typically the .PLS file would be downloaded just once from the media source—such as from an online radio station—for immediate or future use. While most computers and players automatically recognize the .PLS format, the first time a PLS file is used on a computer, the media player's settings may need to be changed to recognize ("associated" with) .PLS files.

PLS was originally developed for use with the museArc audio player software by codeArts, and was later used by SHOUTcast and Icecast for streaming media over the Internet.

== File format ==
The format is case-sensitive and essentially that of an INI file structured as follows

Header

- [playlist] : This tag indicates that it is a Playlist File

Track Entry
Assuming track entry #X

- FileX : Variable defining location of media file/stream (like .m3u/.m3u8 playlists).
- TitleX : Defines track title. (optional)
- LengthX : Length in seconds of track. Value of -1 indicates indefinite (streaming). (optional)

If file metadata includes a title already, then the TitleX entry will not be displayed.

Footer

- NumberOfEntries : This variable indicates the number of tracks and therefore equals the number used for the last track
- Version : Playlist version. Currently only a value of 2 is valid.

=== Examples ===
Example of a complete PLS file used for "streaming audio;" in this case, to connect to a particular online radio station and receive its audio stream:

[playlist]
File1=https://e20.yesstreaming.net:8279/
Title1=Here enter name of the station
NumberOfEntries=1

Alternative Example containing local paths:

[playlist]

File1=https://e20.yesstreaming.net:8279/
Length1=-1

File2=example2.mp3
Title2=Just some local audio that is 2mins long
Length2=120

File3=F:\Music\whatever.m4a
Title3=absolute path on Windows

File4=%UserProfile%\Music\short.ogg
Title4=example for an Environment variable
Length4=5

NumberOfEntries=4
Version=2

Unix/BSD/Linux/OS X

In Unix-like operating systems absolute and relative file paths differ from Windows, because there are no drive letters, environment variables differ and [/] (forward slashes) are used as directory separators instead of [\] (backslashes). Therefore, playlists pointing to absolute paths or media files outside of the folder containing the playlist will only work for one type of operating system — either Windows or Unix-like. URLs work the same for all types.

To make the second example from above work, the 3rd and 4th paths need to be changed to something like:

File3=/media/hdd/whatever.m4a
File4=~/Music/short.ogg

== Compatible media player software ==
iTunes, VLC media player, mpv, GNOME Videos, RealPlayer, Winamp, Yahoo Music Jukebox, MediaMonkey, Windows Media Player, AIMP, Kodi, Rhythmbox, foobar2000, Audacious and more than 30 others are able to interpret (open) PLS files. Media Player Classic with the K-Lite codec installed does work with PLS format, but still requires the appropriate MIME or file extension associations.

== See also ==
Other playlist file formats:

- M3U — The most common playlist format
