= Kiss Technology =

- Type: Subsidiary
- Industry: entertainment technology
- Founded: United States
- Headquarters: United States
- Parent: Cisco Systems

Kiss Technology was an entertainment technology company based in Denmark that existed from 1994 to 2005. It produced DVD players. In 2003, its DR-450 model were the first DVD players that could read the MPEG-4 format, and in 2004, its DP-500 model was able to read all existing DVD formats.

In January 2004, the open-source MPlayer project accused the then Danish DVD player manufacturer, Kiss Technology, of marketing DVD players with firmware that included parts of MPlayer's GPL Licensed code. The implication was that Kiss was violating the GPL License, since Kiss did not release its firmware under the GPL license. The response from the managing director of Kiss, Peter Wilmar Christensen, offered as explanation of the similarities that the MPlayer team had in fact used code stolen from Kiss's firmware, while the release timeline of MPlayer and Kiss firmware does not support such a statement.

Kiss technology was acquired by Cisco Systems on July 22, 2005.
