= SMPlayer =

Graphical front-end for MPlayer and mpv

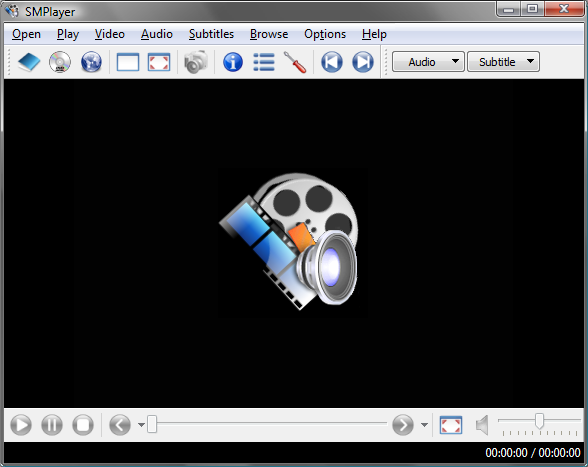
- SMPlayer main window
- Developer: Ricardo Villalba
- Release: December 11, 2006; 19 years ago
- Stable release: 26.8.29 / 30 August 2026; 46 days ago
- Written in: C++ (Qt)
- Operating system: Unix-like, Windows XP and later
- Available in: Multilingual
- Type: Media player
- License: GPL-2.0-or-later
- Website: smplayer.info
- Repository: github.com/smplayer-dev/smplayer

SMPlayer is a cross-platform graphical front-end for MPlayer and mpv and forks of Mplayer using GUI widgets offered by Qt. SMPlayer is free and open-source software subject to the terms of the GNU General Public License version 2 or later. SMplayer has been localized in more than 30 languages.

== Features ==
Some of the features of SMPlayer are: holding a memory of the time position of each file it has played, audio/video filters and equalizer, variable speed playback (it also allows for frame-by-frame playback, forwards or backwards), configurable subtitles with Internet fetch, YouTube & Radio & TV support with playback of up to 4K resolution at 60 fps, skinnable user interface, automatic support for EDL files, and Chromecast support (requires Google Chrome or Chromium and the "webfs" package.)

== Packages ==
Interface playing an audio file on Ubuntu 16.10

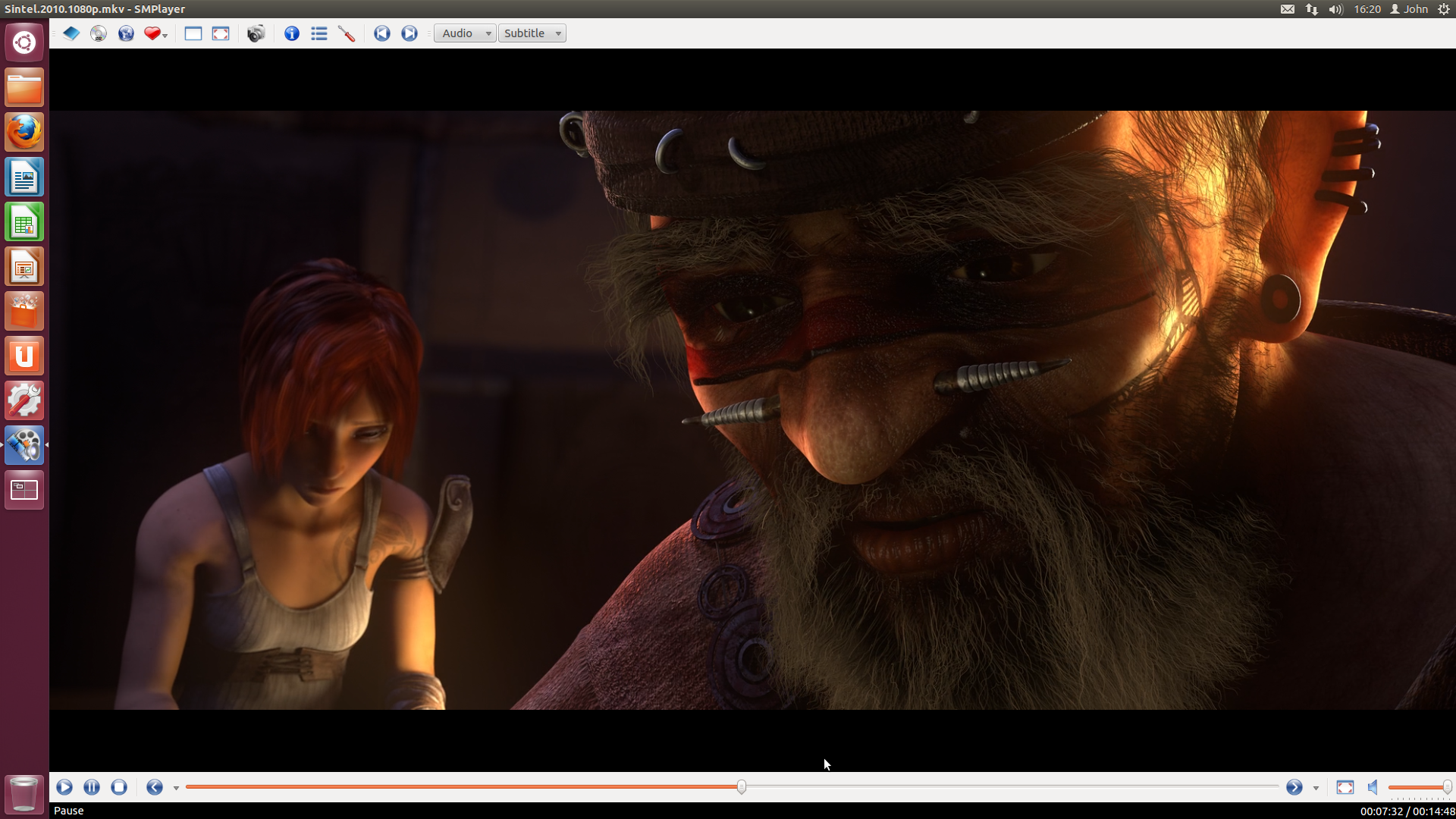
SMPlayer playing the movie Sintel on Ubuntu 12.04.

SMPlayer is built with Qt and is based on MPlayer. This makes it quite portable, since MPlayer and Qt are already available on all major operating systems. On the operating systems on which SMPlayer has not yet been ported to, it is likely possible to run the application through binary compatibility with another Unix or Linux.

In addition to the Windows packages, official binary packages are provided for Ubuntu. Many distributions provide packages in their repositories.

For FreeBSD, SMPlayer is available for installation from source via the ports tree and also available as binary packages for most major FreeBSD releases.

OpenBSD also provides binary packages and is available in its ports collection as well.

SMPlayer is not available yet on NetBSD or DragonFly BSD, either in binary format or in pkgsrc. NetBSD should be able to run the FreeBSD binary without much trouble.

=== Windows ===
Current versions of SMPlayer bundle all codecs inside the installer, therefore there is no longer any need for a web connection during install. Originally, SMPlayer was distributed with a NSIS generated setup (previously Inno Setup) Since version 0.6.7. This installer was capable of downloading and installing the latest MPlayer and MPlayer codec packages during setup. An alternative installer was available with MPlayer included for off-line installs.

"Portable" (no installer) versions are also available in PortableApps format. An independent Doom9 developer offers different Windows packages based on MPlayer binaries ported by Gianluigi Tiesi.

=== Abandoned forks ===
- UMPlayer: An abandoned fork that offered integration with SHOUTcast streams and support for Mac OS X. Since the UMPlayer project is no longer active, the SMPlayer team recommend to use SMPlayer instead, however, they do provide their own updated version of UMPlayer with fixes for its YouTube support
- SMPlayer2: An abandoned fork targeted at mplayer2 users, as of 2014 replaced by SMPlayer with mpv.
