= PotPlayer =

Multimedia software player developed for Microsoft Windows

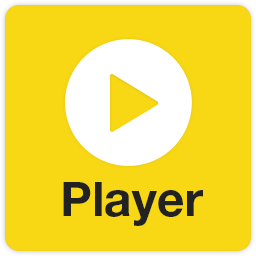
- Original author: Kang Yong-Huee
- Developer: Kakao
- Stable release: 1.7.23171 (October 30, 2026) [±]
- Operating system: Windows 11, Windows 10, Windows 8.1, Windows 7
- Size: ~ 33.6 MB
- Available in: 33 languages
- List of languages Arabic, Armenian, Azerbaijan, Belarusian, Bulgarian, Catalan, Chinese (Simplified and Traditional), Czech, English, French, German, Greek, Hebrew, Hong Kong, Hungarian, Indonesian, Italian, Japanese, Korean, Kurdish, Persian, Polish, Portuguese, Russian, Serbian, Spanish, Swedish, Tajik (Cyrillic), Thai, Turkish, Ukrainian, Uzbek (Latin)
- Type: Media player
- License: Freeware
- Website: potplayer.tv

PotPlayer is a media player software developed for the Microsoft Windows operating system by South Korean Internet company Kakao (formerly Daum Communications). Initially, the player was released under the name Daum Live.

PotPlayer is praised for its wide range of settings and customizations, its lightweight nature and its support for a large variety of media formats. TechRadar placed it among the best free video players, describing it as "an incredibly powerful program". XDA noted the extensive customization options and the improved playback on low-end hardware, naming PotPlayer "the best media player that you've never heard of".

LifeHacker observed that PotPlayer's quantity of options was one of its biggest weaknesses—"It has many different settings[,] which unfortunately makes wading through the checkbox-laden settings menu kind of a pain"—and that its options menu was "confusing".

In 2019, some versions of PotPlayer began to be bundled with third-party software, causing concerns from its user community; however, the installers allowed users to opt-out before the extra software was installed. The player also started showing ads in its lower right-hand corner. As of 2021, the software no longer installs adware or shows ads.

== See also ==
- K-Multimedia Player (also by Kang Yong-Huee)
- Comparison of video player software
