= Elmedia Player =

Video and audio media player software for macOS

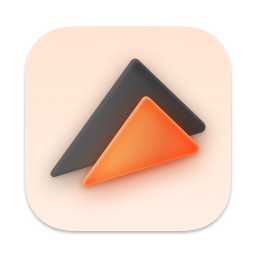
- Developers: Electronic Team, Inc.
- Stable release: 8.24 / December 5, 2025; 6 months ago
- Operating system: macOS
- Available in: English, Czech, Dutch, French, German, Italian, Japanese, Korean, Polish, Simplified Chinese, Spanish and Swedish
- Type: Media player
- License: Freeware
- Website: www.elmedia-video-player.com

Elmedia Player is a freemium media player developed by Electronic Team, Inc. Founded in 2000 as an alternative to QuickTime, it is offered for the macOS operation system. According to the company, the software has 1 million users as of August 2017.

== History ==
Its developer, formerly known as Eltima Software, was founded in 2000 and based in US.

On October 19, 2017, the free version of the media player was reported to have contained a malware trojan due to a security breach. Vice reported that nearly 1,000 users downloaded compromised files. Within a short time, the developers stopped the spread of this malware successfully.

== Media formats ==
Elmedia is capable of playing the following formats:

- Video: MPEG2, MPEG4, H.264/AVC, H.265/HEVC, H.266/VVC.
- Audio: MP3, AAC, MP2, Monkey's Audio, Vorbis, WAV, WMA, FLAC.
- Container: AVI, MKV, VOB, MP4, WEBM

In the July 2023 update, the developers integrated support for H.266/VVC standard, allowing VVC playback up to 8K.

Elmedia Player also allows streaming to Chromecast, Smart TVs, Apple TV, Airplay, and DLNA-compatible devices as well as mirroring iPhone/iPad screens.
