= Videostream =

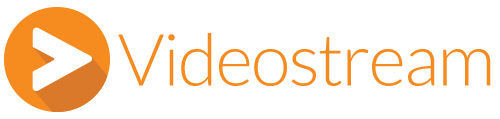
- Headquarters: Kitchener-Waterloo, Ontario
- Industry: Consumer Internet
- Website: getvideostream.com
- Launched: February 2014
- Current status: Active

Videostream was an application that enabled the streaming of video, music, and image files wirelessly to Google's Chromecast. Initially released as a standalone Google Chrome application, it was later released as a browser tab following Google's decision to cease support for the Chrome App Store. As of February 2021, the drag-and-drop feature, along with several other functionalities, has been removed.

Videostream was designed to streamline the process of video streaming to Chromecast. The application was capable of transcoding audio and video of incompatible files into a format supported by Chromecast. Several technology news outlets gave positive feedback on the software's user-friendly interface and its ability to handle various video formats.

== Technology ==
Videostream used several open-source libraries, including the FFmpeg project.

== Major Features ==
=== Video Casting ===
Videostream supports over 400 different audio and video codecs, offering multiple quality settings to allow playback under different network conditions. However, users have reported issues with casting to Chromecast when using AVG and Avast internet virus software.

=== Mobile File Browsing ===
In February 2015, Videostream introduced a media library feature that allowed file browsing from mobile devices.

== Monetization ==
Videostream was available free of charge, although a premium version was offered for additional features. The reliability and support for this premium version have been subjects of user feedback.
