= JRiver Media Center =

Media player software

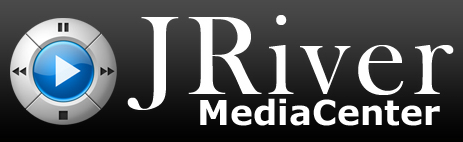

- Media Center running in Windows
- Developers: JRiver, Inc.
- Release: 1998; 28 years ago
- Stable release: 34.0.24 (Windows) (May 6, 2025; 18 months ago) [±]
- Written in: C++
- Operating system: Windows, Linux, and macOS
- Available in: 15 languages
- List of languages: Albanian; Chinese; Czech; Dutch; British English; English; French; German; Greek; Italian; Japanese; Korean; Portuguese; Romanian; Spanish
- Type: Media player
- License: Proprietary
- Website: www.jriver.com

JRiver Media Center is a media player and multimedia application that allows users to play and organize various types of media on a computer running Windows, macOS, or Linux operating systems. Developed by JRiver, Inc., it is offered as shareware.

JRiver Media Center is a "jukebox"-style media player, like iTunes, which usually uses most of the screen to display a potentially very large library of files. Features include photo and video organization and slideshow playback, the ability to rip and burn CDs, creation and playback of playlists and smart playlists with custom rules, independent media playback to multiple outputs, and plugins such as Audioscrobbler and G-Force visualization. It also has many interface layouts for different use cases, such as the standard mode for normal use, theater mode for use as a media center application for large screens, and mini mode.

Regular (usually daily beta) builds are posted on the Media Center Interact forum implementing requested features and fixing reported bugs. The forum has an active member community, with more than 56,000 members as of 2021.

== History ==
JRiver Media Center was created by J. River, Inc., a Minneapolis-based company founded in 1982 by James "Jim" Hillegass that developed networking and internet software for Windows, DOS and Unix. Originally the software was known as Media Jukebox and had both free and premium versions.

Media Jukebox 3.0

The company announced in 2001 that it planned to launch a subscription service for Media Jukebox to compete with Napster.

The software was rebranded to JRiver Media Center for version 9 in 2003.

Screenshot of JRiver Media Center's Theater Mode with the Glass theme in showroom view

In November 2007, J. River released Media Jukebox 12, a stripped-down version of JRiver Media Center 12, which is available to download for free, compared to JRiver Media Center's price of $49.98. JRiver Media Jukebox includes most of the audio features of Media Center;but the image and video functions are removed. The last version of JRiver Media Jukebox was version 14.0.166. However, the version 14 removed several features previously available for free (specifically CD and cover art lookup) and now only available in the Media Center product. As such many still use the older free version of JRiver Media Jukebox 12.0.534.

== Version history ==
Major version	Latest version	Initial Release	Significant changes
6.0		2000	DVD playback; Broadcast and cable TV (ATI cards)
7.0		May 2001	Crossfading and gapless playback
9.0		May 5, 2003	Initial Media Center Release. Was Media Jukebox previously.
10.0		Apr 9, 2004	Improved Action Window; ThunderStorm skin; Media Mode Buttons; Streamlined Tree; 3D Visualizations
11.0		Jul 18, 2005	Split Views; Faster database; Theater View enhancements; New Image Editor; Audible integration; UPnP support; Video CD playback; Multi-channel support (5.1, 7.1, etc.) for WAV and WMA files
12.0.151	12.0.534	Jan 23, 2007	New "Display View"; Search & Sort speedups; New tag system; Background (auto) import and folder watching; DirectShow controls; Display Action Window; New look
13.0.113	13.0.172	Jan 28, 2009	New Theater View; Skin; TV Recording was rebuilt; Cover art auto lookup; See reference for detailed list
14.0.46	14.0.161	Aug 7, 2009	Native support of DirectShow; Headphone DSP; Improved tagging; Surround Sound output; Room Correction; Photoshop(psd) support; Video tagging; Hulu integration; general speedups
15.0.35	15.0.174	May 5, 2010	WebRemote; Portable Settings; Kernel Streaming; Cover View
16.0.75	16.0.176	Apr 28, 2011	Netflix integration; Play Doctor; Intelligent Search; Set Top Box support; Play From Play To; Relational DB Fields; madVR Video Renderer
17.0.22	17.0.189	Apr 10, 2012	Super Audio CD ISO playback; Gapless iTunes encoded MP3 playback; Resample by sample rate; Red October Improvements; Commercial skipping
18.0.78	18.0.212	Nov 27, 2012	Video to Audio conversion; ZoneSwitch; Multi-drive ripping for BD and DVD; AIFF and ALAC encoding; Desktop background slideshow; Red October HQ; Windows 8 support
19.0.32	19.0.163	Aug 30, 2013	Native CD Art Display; TV EPG download scheduling; User accounts; RAW image support; Real-time DSD output and improved volume leveling
20.0.10	20.0.132	Aug 28, 2014	DSP over DLNA; WDM Driver; Linked Tracks (always play together)
21.0.5	21.0.90	Sep 11, 2015	4K improvements for high DPI displays; Shared Views - backup / share views; DSP Presets can be saved / loaded; DSP per file; 4x DSD delivered as DoP; 3D Blu-ray and MKV 3D support; Volume Leveling uses additional headroom; Touch screen support for images; JRemote Android App is now available
22.0.15	22.0.97	Aug 5, 2016	Single Frame Video Playback; Open Subtitles Lookup; Listening Test; Theater view for Mac/Linux; Theater View Lighting - Control lighting; View Extras; Sox Resampler; Panel—a web app remote
23.0.7	23.0.102	Summer 2017	Panel—a web app remote; JRiver's WDM driver works with Tidal and WASAPI Exclusive Mode; Auto-fill Car Radio Buttons; PowerPlay; Radio KISS; HTTPS/SSL—Secure Connections; WavPack DSD; Support for Artwork.zip
24.0.2	24.0.77	May 2018	Blu-ray Menus; UHD Blu-ray Title Playback; ZoneSync; Zone Groups—similar to Playlist Groups; TV Post-Process Command
25.0.1	25.0.115	January 2019	New Features in MC25
26.0.1	26.0.107	November 2019	New Features in MC26
27.0.1	27.0.85	August 2020	New Features in MC27
28.0.1	27.0.63	April 2021	New Features in MC28

== See also ==
- Comparison of media players
- Musicmatch Jukebox
- RealJukebox
