= GNOME Videos =

Media player software of the desktop environment GNOME

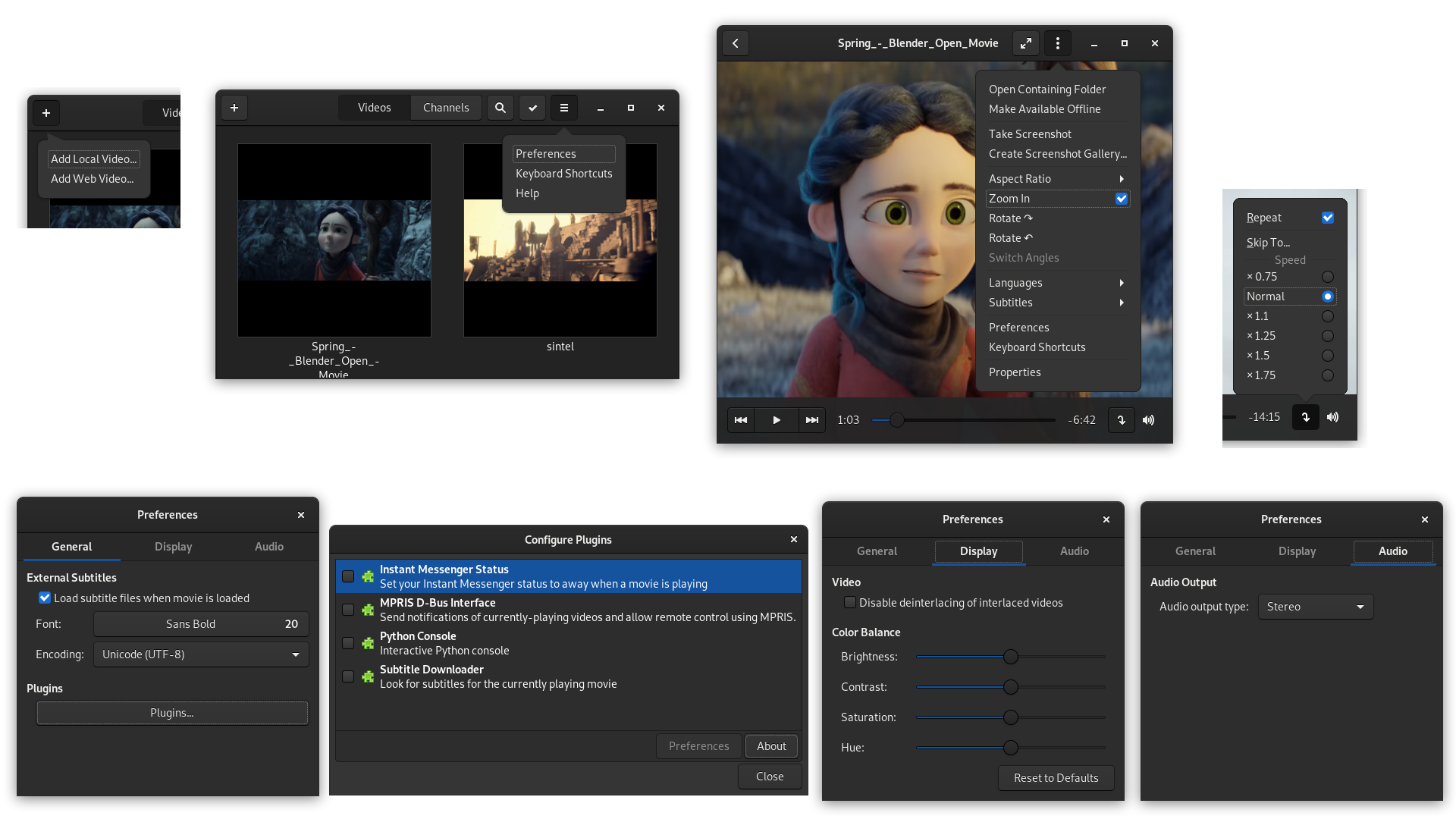
- GNOME Videos 3.34 with its preferences
- Developer: The GNOME Project
- Release: February 2003; 23 years ago
- Stable release: 43.2 / 21 May 2025; 15 months ago
- Written in: C, Python, Vala
- Operating system: Unix-like
- Platform: GTK+, Clutter
- Type: Media player
- License: GPL-2.0-or-later with exception
- Website: apps.gnome.org/Totem/
- Repository: gitlab.gnome.org/GNOME/totem.git

GNOME Videos, formerly known as Totem, is a media player (audio and video) for the GNOME computer desktop environment. GNOME Videos uses the Clutter and GTK+ toolkits. It is officially included in GNOME starting from version 2.10 (released in March 2005), but de facto it was already included in most GNOME environments. Totem utilizes the GStreamer framework for playback, though until version 2.27.1, it could alternatively be configured to use the Xine libraries instead of GStreamer.

GNOME Videos is free and open-source software subject to the requirements of the GPL-2.0-or-later license.

In GNOME 49, GNOME Videos was replaced as the default GNOME video player with a new GTK 4 & Libadwaita application called Showtime.

== Features ==
Until recently there were two distinct versions of Totem, though the difference was not visible at the user interface level. One of them was based on GStreamer, which is a plugin-based multimedia framework. This version has superior extensibility and supports a larger variety of media formats. The other one was based on xine, which is a regular multimedia library. At the time the latter had better encrypted DVD playback support, DVD navigation support and could play some files the GStreamer version couldn't handle. Due to enhancements in GStreamer including the ability to play back encrypted DVDs, the Totem development team dropped support for the xine backend.

Totem is closely integrated with the GNOME desktop environment and its file manager, GNOME Files. This includes generating thumbnails of video files when browsing in GNOME Files and a video plugin for Netscape-compatible browsers (e.g. Firefox and GNOME Web).

Thanks to a large number of plugins developed for GStreamer, Totem is able to play all mainstream media formats, both open and proprietary ones. It also understands numerous playlist formats, including SHOUTcast, M3U, XML Shareable Playlist Format (XSPF), SMIL, Windows Media Player playlists and RealAudio playlists. Playlists are easily manageable using drag-and-drop features.

Full-screen video playback is supported on nearly all X configurations, including multi-head Xinerama setups, and on displays connected to the TV-Out. Brightness, contrast and saturation of the video can be dynamically adjusted during playback. 4.0, 4.1, 5.0, 5.1 and stereophonic sound is supported. On computers with an infrared port, Totem can be remotely controlled via LIRC. Stills can be easily captured without resorting to external programs. There is also a plugin for telestrator-like functionality using Gromit. The loading of external SubRip subtitles, both automatic and manual (via the command line), is also supported.

The player was known as Totem. With the release of version 3.5.90, the name was changed to GNOME Videos. The name 'Totem', remained in 'de facto' use (the executable, for example, still uses the Totem name, as does its package in Debian).

GNOME 3.12 revamped the user interface radically and added support for direct playback from online video channels such as Guardian and Apple trailers.

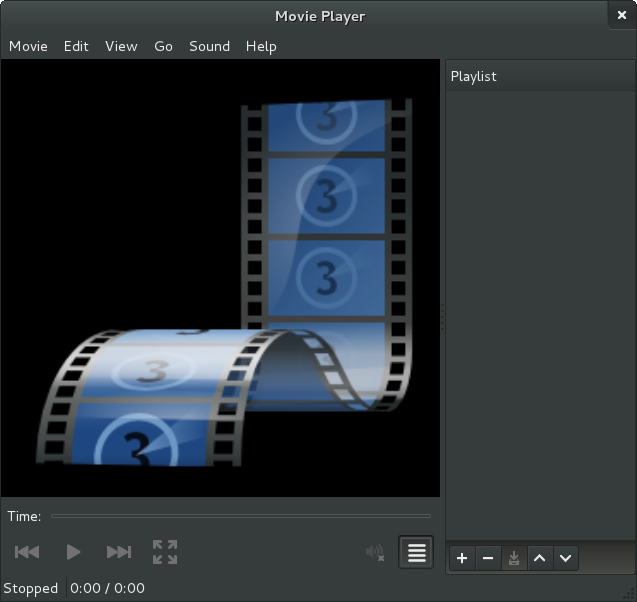
A screenshot of the player's old interface, used up to version 3.10

=== Video acceleration ===
Whether GNOME Videos can offload computations for video decoding to SIP blocks such as PureVideo, UVD, QuickSync Video, TI Ducati through interfaces, like e.g. VDPAU, VAAPI, Distributed Codec Engine or DXVA depends entirely on the back-end. See GStreamer or Xine for such support.

== Replacement ==
In GNOME 49, Totem was replaced as the default GNOME video player with a new GTK 4 & Libadwaita application called Showtime. Totem was replaced by Showtime due to the lack of maintenance of Totem over the past several years and it thus being stuck on GTK 3, not the most recent by a GTK 4 & Libadwaita toolkit used by other GNOME Core Applications. It will be renamed in GNOME to Video Player in GNOME 49 similarly to how other GNOME Core Applications such as GNOME Files (known internally as Nautilus) and Decibels (known as Audio Player) are named in GNOME.

Showtime will maintain all of Totem's features with the exception of playing back DVD videos, as many modern computers no longer ship with built-in optical drives.

== See also ==
- Parole Media Player - another media player based on GStreamer, it is light-weight and has a similar user interface like the older versions of Totem / GNOME Videos.
