= Xine =

Multimedia playback software for Unix-like systems

xine project
- Release: August 15, 2000; 25 years ago
- Written in: C
- Operating system: Cross-platform
- Type: Media player
- License: GPL-2.0-or-later
- Website: xine.sourceforge.net
- Repository: sourceforge.net/project/xine/

xine-lib
- Stable release: 1.2.13 (January 5, 2023; 3 years ago) [±]
- Website: xine.sourceforge.net
- Repository: sourceforge.net/p/xine/xine-lib-1.2/ci/default/tree/

xine-ui
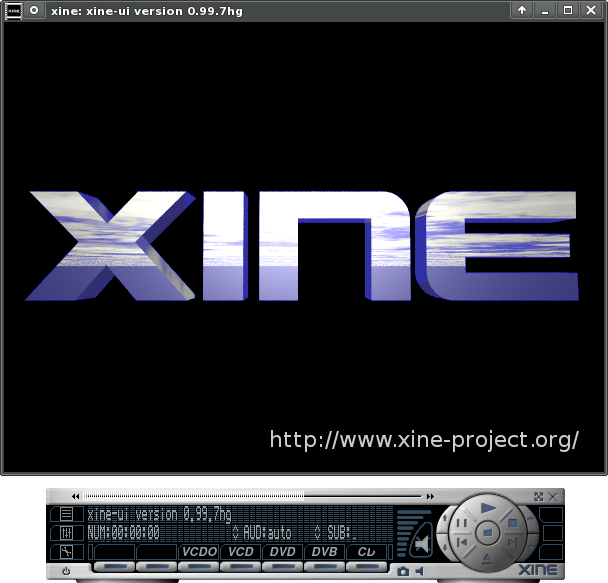
- Stable release: 0.99.14 (January 7, 2023; 3 years ago) [±]
- Preview release: none (n/a) [±]
- Website: xine.sourceforge.net
- Repository: sourceforge.net/p/xine/xine-ui/ci/default/tree/

gxine
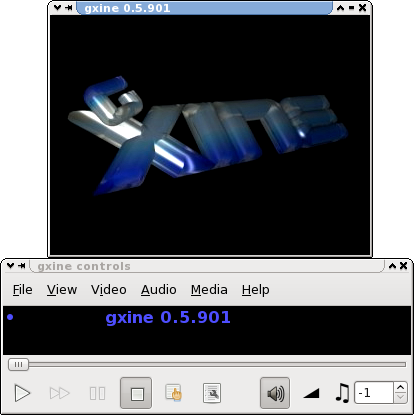
- Stable release: 0.5.910 (December 28, 2017; 8 years ago) [±]
- Website: xine.sourceforge.net
- Repository: sourceforge.net/p/xine/gxine/ci/default/tree/

xine-plugin
- Stable release: 1.0.2 (July 26, 2008; 17 years ago) [±]
- Website: xine.sourceforge.net
- Repository: sourceforge.net/p/xine/xine-plugin/ci/default/tree/

xine /ˈksiːn/ is a multimedia playback engine for Unix-like operating systems released under the GNU General Public License. xine is built around a shared library (xine-lib) that supports different frontend player applications. xine uses libraries from other projects such as liba52, libmpeg2, FFmpeg, libmad, FAAD2, and Ogle. xine can also use binary Windows codecs through a wrapper, bundled as the w32codecs, for playback of some media formats that are not handled natively.

== History ==
The xine project was started in 2000 by Günter Bartsch shortly after LinuxTag. At that time playing DVDs in Linux was described as a tortuous process since one had to manually create audio and video named pipes and start their separate decoder processes.

Günter realized the OMS (Open Media System) or LiViD approach had obvious shortcomings in terms of audio and video synchronization, so xine was born as an experiment trying to get it right. The project evolved into a modern media player multi-threaded architecture.

During xine development, some effort was dedicated to making a clear separation of the player engine (xine-lib) and front-end (xine-ui). Since the 1.0 release (2004-12-25) the API of xine-lib is considered stable and several applications and players rely on it.

Günter left the project in 2003 when he officially announced the new project leaders, Miguel Freitas, Michael Roitzsch, Mike Melanson, and Thibaut Mattern.

== Supported media formats ==
- Physical media: CDs, DVDs, Video CDs
- Container formats: 3gp, AVI, ASF, FLV, Matroska, MOV (QuickTime), MP4, NUT, Ogg, OGM, RealMedia
- Audio formats: AAC, AC3, ALAC, AMR, FLAC, MP3, RealAudio, Shorten, Speex, Vorbis, WMA
- Video formats: Cinepak, DV, H.263, H.264/MPEG-4 AVC, HuffYUV, Indeo, MJPEG, MPEG-1, MPEG-2, MPEG-4 ASP, RealVideo, Sorenson, Theora, WMV (partial, including WMV1, WMV2 and WMV3; via FFmpeg)
- Video devices: V4L, DVB, PVR
- Network protocols: HTTP, TCP, UDP, RTP, SMB, MMS, PNM, RTSP

== DVD issues ==
Since it is not a member of DVD Forum, the xine project is not contractually obliged to insert user operation prohibition such as disallowing fast-forward or skipping during trailers and ads. However, without membership in the Forum, the project also cannot make xine play DVDs encrypted with CSS except by using reverse-engineered code. xine therefore uses the libdvdcss library, which was created by reverse engineering. The legal status of libdvdcss is questionable in several nations; in the United States, for example, the Digital Millennium Copyright Act arguably prohibits reverse-engineering of CSS. Virtually all commercial DVDs are encrypted with CSS.

== Other issues ==
To prevent a screensaver from starting, xine sends a scroll lock key signal to the environment to pretend keyboard interaction took place. This can often lead to issues with other programs running as they receive the scroll lock key as normal input. One example is the Konsole terminal emulator, which changes the behaviour of the arrow keys when scroll lock is used.

== Graphical user interface ==
The xine project offers graphical front-ends for xine, including one based on Xlib and another on GTK+, along with a browser plugin. Other front-ends for xine are available from other projects.

== xine backend ==
The shared library 'xine-lib' used and developed by xine is also used by other projects. For example, it can be used instead of GStreamer as a backend for the Phonon media framework used by KDE and Qt.

== See also ==
- List of codecs
  - Open source codecs and containers
  - Comparison of video codecs
- Comparison of audio coding formats
- Comparison of container formats
- Screencast
