= ALLPlayer =

Polish media player

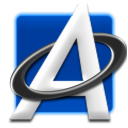

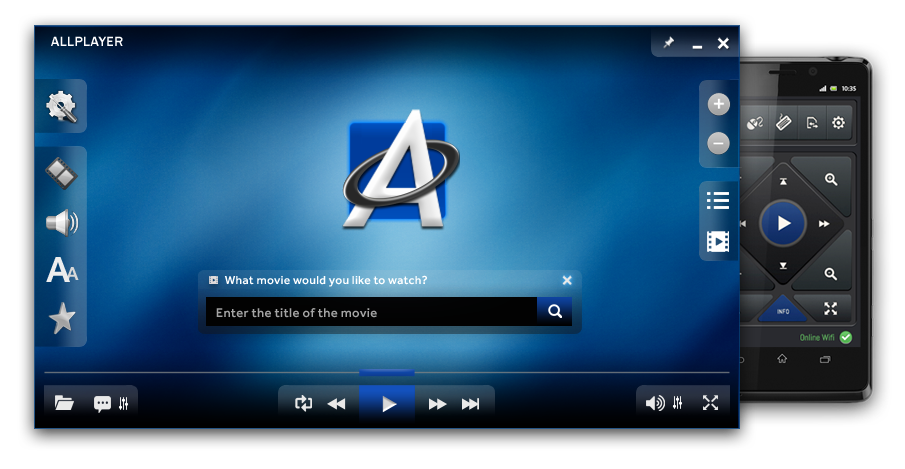
- Developer: ALLPlayer Group Ltd.
- Stable release: 8.9.2 (April 4, 2022; 4 years ago) [±]
- Operating system: Windows XP and later, Android, iOS
- Size: 40 MB
- Available in: 14 languages
- List of languages English, Polish, Russian, German, French, Spanish, Vietnamese, Chinese, Hungarian, Italian, Portuguese, Arabic, Hindi, Japanese
- Type: Media player
- License: Freeware
- Website: allplayer.org allplayer.com

ALLPlayer is a cross-platform media player and streaming media server written by ALLPlayer Group Ltd. ALLPlayer is available for desktop Windows and mobile platforms, such as Android, iPad and iPhone iOS. The program is available on App Store, Google Play Store and the Microsoft Windows Store.

ALLPlayer supports many file formats, including video CD and streaming protocols. It is also able to stream media over computer networks. ALLPlayer features include automatic codec updates, cooperation with subtitles servers (e.g. OpenSubtitles) for downloading subtitles in multiple languages, and the ability to play BitTorrent movies and series with matching subtitles. ALLPlayer has remote control and keyboard hotkeys.

ALLPlayer can also play incomplete, or unfinished files, such as files that are still downloading via a peer-to-peer (P2P) network.

ALLPlayer was built using the Delphi programming language.
