= Mac Blu-ray Player =

Media playing software

- Developer: Macgo Inc.
- Release: 2011
- Stable release: 3.3.23 / March 15, 2025; 17 months ago
- Operating system: macOS; Windows
- Type: Blu-ray Disc software
- Website: www.macblurayplayer.com

Macgo Mac Blu-ray Player is a proprietary media player software, first released in 2011 by Macgo Inc. It provides playback functionality for Blu-ray Discs, DVDs, and other media formats for macOS and Microsoft Windows. Free trial versions are available for both Mac and PC platforms. It is also a media player for playing Blu-ray Disc/Folder or ISO files on Windows 8.1/8/7/Vista/XP.

== Features ==
- The only Mac Blu-ray software officially licensed by BDA
- Supports Blu-ray Menu
- Support for up to 5.1 surround sound decoding, or 7.1 passthrough to external decoder
- HD audiovisual quality
- Hardware accelerated playback
- Support for discs from different regions
- Multi-language support
- Support for playback of Blu-ray DVD and CD titles from discs, ISO images, and folders
- Support for Blu-ray Disc playback on iPhone/iPad/iPod Touch
- Ability to share video information on Facebook and Twitter

== Supported platforms ==
- Intel Core 2 Duo 2.4 GHz and equivalent, or Apple silicon arm
- Mac OS X 10.6 (Snow Leopard) - macOS 12.1 (macOS Monterey)
- Windows XP (SP2 or later) - Windows 10

== Support formats ==
- Video input: BD (Blu-ray Disc), Blu-ray ISO, DVD Video, Video CD, VCD, AVI, ASF, WMV, MP4, MOV, 3GP, Matroska (MKV), FLV (Flash), RMVB, Raw DV
- Audio input: WMA, WAV (including DTS), Audio CD (no DTS-CD), MPEG (ES, PS, TS, PVA, MP3), Raw Audio: DTS, AAC, AC3, A52
- Video output: X11, XVideo, SDL, FrameBuffer, ASCII Art
- Audio output: S/PDIF, Multi-channel, PulseAudio, PortAudio, JACK

== Media Reviews ==
- tuaw.com. August 16, 2012 https://web.archive.org/web/20150131134808/http://www.tuaw.com/2012/08/16/mac-blu-ray-player-software-plays-hd-movies-on-your-mac/. Archived from the original on January 31, 2015.
- Cnet
- Redmond Pie
- lifehacker
- Macworld
- iTWire
- Archive from electronista
- Macgo Software
- Conodi (in German)
