= Ogle DVD Player =

Open source DVD player

Ogle
- Original author: Students of Chalmers University of Technology
- Developer: Students of Chalmers University of Technology
- Final release: 0.9.2 (November 6, 2003; 22 years ago) [±]
- Preview release: 1.0pre7try2 (August 26, 2005; 21 years ago) [±]
- Operating system: Unix
- Type: Media player
- License: GNU GPL
- Website: Ogle website

Ogle is a DVD player for Linux, and other Unix-like operating systems. It was released as free software under the GNU GPL license. It was originally developed in 1999 by a few students at Chalmers Tekniska Högskola (Chalmers University of Technology) in Göteborg, Sweden, and maintained until late 2003. It was the first free software/open source DVD player able to play DVD menus and can play CSS encrypted DVDs, but does not play DVDs with ripping protection schemes such as ARccOS Protection that are common on movie DVDs from major studios. Ogle does not play anything other than DVDs. Ogle runs from the command line, but with the FOX toolkit install it can be used with the Goggles GUI.

== See also ==
- List of codecs
