= GOM Player =

Media player

- GOM Player, using default skin
- Developers: GOM & Company (Previously Gretech)
- Initial release: January 7, 2003; 23 years ago
- Stable release: Windows 2.3.116 (February 24, 2026; 3 months ago) iOS 1.5.1 (February 26, 2020; 6 years ago) Android 1.6.1 (August 30, 2021; 4 years ago) [±]
- Preview release: None [±]
- Operating system: Microsoft Windows, macOS, Android, iOS
- Platform: x86-64
- Available in: Korean, English, Japanese, Spanish, Turkish, Russian, Portuguese, Thai, German, French, Italian, Czech, Chinese (Traditional and Simplified)
- Type: Media player
- License: Adware
- Website: gomlab.com/gomplayer-media-player/

GOM Player is a media player for Microsoft Windows, developed by GOM & Company. With more than 100 million downloads, it is also known as the most used player in South Korea.

The player has been known to install malware.

GOM Player has a free version and a paid version. The paid version name is GOM Player Plus, and it allows video playback without advertisements and includes additional features such as simpler configuration.

== Third-party malware controversy ==
In January 2019, it was reported to install third-party malware. Users also reported the issue a year before in January 2018.

== See also ==
- Comparison of video player software
- Comparison of video codecs
- List of codecs
