= DirectVobSub =

Software add-on that can read external subtitle files

DirectVobSub (VSFilter)
- Original author: Gabest
- Developers: Armada, janwillem32, nevcairiel, Underground78, v0lt, vBm, XhmikosR
- Stable release: 2.41.7259 / May 13, 2013; 13 years ago
- Operating system: Microsoft Windows
- Platform: DirectShow
- Type: Filter
- License: GPL

DirectVobSub (formerly known as VSFilter) is a software add-on for Microsoft Windows (a DirectShow filter) that is able to read external subtitle files and superimposes them on a playing video file.

DirectVobSub/VSFilter were formerly part of a whole application known as VobSub which was also able to extract subtitles from DVD Video and create text-based subtitles, without ripping the DVD to a file first. The last version of VobSub was version 2.23, after which the development of VobSub ceased. VSFilter was a part of the guliverkli project on the SourceForge web site. The guliverkli project also includes the ability to extract subtitles from a DVD via the vobsub ripper program. However, development of guliverkli ceased in 2005 with version 2.37. In 2007, it became a part of the Guliverkli2 project, now known as DirectVobSub, starting with version 2.38. But till September, 2012, the last guliverkli2 commitment was on April 10, 2011. Then, the MPC-HC project took over the sources. Under that project, DirectVobSub was very briefly in active development again, but MPC-HC shut down in 2017 due to a lack of developers.

DirectVobSub is also capable of extracting subtitles from a DVD without ripping it to a file first. "Vobsub rippers" are also available for the same effect. Note also the guliverkli project has a related project VSrip.

== Supported Subtitle formats ==
Format name	Extension
VobSub	.sub/.idx
SubStation Alpha/Advanced SubStation Alpha	.ssa/.ass
SubRip	.srt
MicroDVD	.sub
SAMI	.smi
PowerDivX	.psb
Universal Subtitle Format	.usf
Structured Subtitle Format	.ssf

== See also ==
- Media Player Classic
