= 24p =

Video format that operates at 24 frames per second

In video technology, 24p refers to a video format that operates at a 24 frames per second frame rate with progressive scanning (not interlaced). Originally, 24p was used in the non-linear editing of film-originated material. Today, 24p formats are being increasingly used for aesthetic reasons in digital image acquisition, delivering film-like motion characteristics. Some vendors advertise 24p products as a cheaper alternative to film acquisition.

When working entirely within the digital non-linear domain, 24p material is more easily handled than material of higher frame rates. 24p material requires care when it is processed using equipment designed for standard video frame rates.

There are two common workflows for processing 24p material using video equipment, one using PAL frame rates, and the other using NTSC frame rates. Of these two, the PAL route is the simpler, but each has its own complications.

== 24p vs. PAL video ==
=== Converting 24p to PAL ===
24p material can be converted to the PAL format with the same methods used to convert film to PAL. The most popular method is to speed up the material by 1/24 (≈4.1%). Each 24p frame will take the place of two 50i fields. This method incurs no motion artifacts other than the slightly increased speed, which is typically not noticeable. As for audio, the ≈4.1% increase in speed raises the pitch by 0.707 of a semitone, which again typically is not noticed. Sometimes the audio is pitch shifted to restore the original pitch.

If 24p footage cannot be sped up (for example if it were coming through a live NTSC or HD feed), it instead can be converted in a pattern where most frames were held on screen for two fields, but every half second a frame would be held for three fields. Thus the viewer would see motion stutter twice per second. This was the common result when programs were shot on film or had film portions, edited on NTSC, and then shown in PAL countries (mostly music videos). NTSC to PAL conversion also tends to blur each film frame into the next, and so is seen as a sub-optimal way to view film footage.

30p can be preferable over 24p since performing a standards conversion to 25i PAL has fewer technical complexities – any NTSC–PAL converter will do. The larger differences between the 30p and 25i framerates will cause less noticeable motion artifacts upon conversion.

=== Non-linear editing and 24/25 telecine ===
The process of transferring 24 frame/s video at 25 frame/s rates is also the most common method for ingesting 24p film rushes into a non-linear editor. The resulting 25 frame/s video can then be transferred into a non-linear editing system at 25 frame/s, maintaining the 1:1 frame correspondence between film frames and video frames. Once in the non-linear editing system, the editing system, knowing that the material actually originated at 24 frame/s rather than at 25 frame/s, will replay it at the correct speed.

The original film Keykode and 24 frame/s audio timecode can then be reconciled with the 25 frame/s telecine timecode by the generation of a telecine log file containing this information. Again, once the non-linear editor has this information, editing can be performed entirely in terms of 24 frame/s timecode, and the Keykode information preserved for either film cutting or digital intermediate post-production of scanned film images.

Because sound is recorded separately from moving pictures in 24p projects, there are no problems regarding synchronization or audio pitch: the audio material is simply ingested separately from the moving picture material at its natural rate, and synchronized within the non-linear editor.

== 24p vs. NTSC video ==
=== Conversion of 24p to NTSC-based frame/field rates ===
Working with 24p material via video equipment working at NTSC frame rates has many of the same attributes as the 24 frame/s workflow, but is more complicated by the NTSC-rate practice of using telecine pull-down rather than the PAL practice of transferring 24 frame/s material at 25 frame/s.

At 525 lines analog NTSC video rates (30000/1001 frames per second), a full interlaced frame, unlike a progressive frame, is nearly 1/30th of a second and is composed of two separate "fields", each field nearly 1/60 second. The first field (the odd field) contains visible scan lines 21-263 and the second field (the even field) contains visible scan lines 283–525 (though lines 263 and 283 are half-lines). What is seen onscreen is two of these fields, interlaced together, to produce a single full frame. This comes from the proper longhand designation being vertical resolution, followed by the interlaced/progressive notation, and then the frame rate. So typical DV video is correctly listed as 480i/30. The longhand for 24p is 480p/24. Often the resolution is dropped, and the i/p designation moved after the frame rate for shorthand.

24p cameras do not, as NTSC video cameras do, shoot 30 interlaced frames per second (60 fields); they shoot 24 full progressive frames per second.

24p material can be recorded directly into formats that support the framerate. Some high-definition formats support the 24p framerate in addition to 60i and 50i (PAL). Previously, few formats supported 24p and the industry used workarounds to work with 24p footage with 60i equipment.

To record 24p material onto a 60i format (i.e., any NTSC-based format), pulldown is typically added to 'pad' the 24 frames into 60 fields. This is done by taking every frame and splitting it into two fields. Then, every second frame has one of its fields duplicated, resulting in three fields. The fields are then played back in that pattern – 2-3-2-3-2-3-2-3-2-3-2-3-2-3 ... and so on. The resulting video becomes a 60i stream and can be displayed on NTSC monitors. However, the aesthetic of 24p motion is retained and the footage does not have the motion of typical 60i video.

This 3:2 pulldown is the same process that is used when transferring film into video.

Any editing application which supports NTSC video can be used to edit footage employing the 3:2 pulldown scheme. It can be captured as a standard 60i file and edited like footage from any other camera, while still retaining its 24p aesthetic. There can be issues when editing the footage as 60i, however, including choppiness in short transitions or fades, and also a mismatch in the motion characteristics of the footage and any graphics which may be added to it, such as text or logos. So, while 24p footage can be edited as 60i, it is usually better to edit the footage on a 24p timeline with the pulldown removed.

Most current prosumer-level editing applications that edit native 24p can remove the 3:2 pulldown for editing in native 24p, although some cannot. However, this is not ideal; the removal of the 3:2 pulldown involves reconstruction of every fourth frame from two different field groups, which can cause a generational loss and some banding problems if the application doesn't interpret the footage properly. Therefore, using the 3:2 pulldown scheme is not ideal when planning to edit on a 24p timeline.

Note: "3:2 pulldown" has a cadence of 2-3-2-3-2-3..., but in the industry is called "3:2 pulldown", even though the cadence is 2–3. Some people use the term "2:3 pulldown", which corresponds to the cadence, but is not normally used in the industry for the technique.

=== Advanced pulldown ===
Another pulldown pattern is the "advanced pulldown" ("24pA") pattern, first implemented in the Panasonic AG-DVX100 camcorder. Instead of padding the frames into a repeating 3:2 pattern, the frames are padded into a 2:3:3:2 pattern. This pattern is specific to the NTSC DV format, and would serve no purpose in native 24p formats.

It converts the first frame into two fields, the second into three fields, the third into three fields, and the fourth into two fields. It then repeats this pattern for every group of four frames that follows. This pulldown pattern is used to avoid segmenting a 24p frame into two different 60i fields that exist in two different 60i frames. When a 24p frame is split up and recorded into separate 60i fields, interlacing artifacts can exist in the 60i "frames" (i.e. two fields). These artifacts decrease the compression efficiency of DV and can result in cycles of efficient compression followed by less-efficient compression. The advanced pulldown scheme avoids this as every 24p frame can be found intact within the resulting sequence of 60i frames, yet the compression efficiency remains the same as with 3:2 pulldown.

When editing 24pA footage, conversion from 60i back to the original 24p is very efficient. It only requires blending the fields made from the frames back into full frames. Then, only every fifth frame will be made up of fields from two different frames, and that frame can be discarded, leaving only the other four full frames. In order for this to work properly, the DVX100 camera records video in chunks of five video frames. This ensures that each clip has regular and predictable cadence.

Because the 2:3:3:2 scheme was devised for efficient pulldown removal for editing, and because 24p editing applications more universally support its removal, it should always be used when planning to edit in native 24p.

Editing systems need specific support for the 24pA format to be able to detect and remove the pulldown properly so that the 24p frames can be edited in a 24p timeline. Many but not all prosumer and professional-level non-linear editing systems are able to recognize and remove this advanced pulldown scheme. However, among the editing applications able to remove pulldown and edit in native 24p, it is more common for them to have support for 24pA 2:3:3:2 pulldown than for standard 24p 3:2 pulldown removal.

Still other editing applications have the option for editing on a 24p timeline, and will accept footage where the pulldown has already been removed in another application.

Remember that although computer editing systems may refer to "24p", usually the frame rate is 23.976 frame/s. To add to the confusion, the popular editing program Final Cut Pro refers to 23.976 as "23.98" in menus and dialogs, even though it correctly works with the footage at the 23.976 frame rate. 23.976 is also not precise, though, as the real frame rate is 24000 ÷ 1001, so 23.98 is also a correct approximation.

Also, because the 2:3:3:2 pulldown scheme was devised in order to make pulldown removal for editing in native 24p more efficient, the pulldown arrangement is not ideal for watching footage. There can be exaggerated stutters in motion, because the frames which are split into three fields are not only onscreen for 50% longer than the other frames, they are back-to-back. As such, 2:3:3:2 pulldown should be used only when a native 24p edit is planned, and not for final viewing. This includes when shooting the footage initially, and also when printing back to tape from an NLE.

=== 60i to 24p conversions ===
Another method of achieving the 24p aesthetic is to capture 60i footage and convert it into 24p. Various techniques can be used to perform this conversion. A simple scheme would blend the fields together. This can result in motion artifacts where comb-like jagged artifacts appear in areas of high motion. Deinterlacing can remove these artifacts, but certain methods will cause up to half the footage's vertical resolution to be lost. Adaptive deinterlacing schemes only deinterlace areas of high motion, hence preserving resolution in stationary areas. More advanced techniques can be used to mitigate problems such as aliasing from the temporal displacement between the 60i fields.

=== The Optical Flow Method ===
This is currently the highest quality method of converting 60i footage to 24p. It involves using optical flow to extrapolate 24 frames of information from 60 frames while compensating for the time displacement between the two. For example, in one second of 60i footage, each image is captured at 1/60 second, which does not perfectly align with images that would have been captured 24 times per second. Simply cherry picking 24 images out of 60 does not present 24 frames with perfect temporal consistency, since more or less time may have elapsed between frames. The result is a slightly jittery picture, which appears to jitter in a cyclic fashion. Optical flow algorithms will analyze the footage and make corrections to the picture in order to better "fit" each frame into the new 24-frame sequence. The resulting footage is much smoother because it simulates equal exposure time between frames.

For best results, footage should be deinterlaced and frame-doubled to 60p. This preserves all of the footage's temporal information, which is key in determining what the "missing" points in time should look like when converting to 24 frame/s.

The last step is to compensate for the lack of motion blur in the 60i footage. Since the images were captured at 1/60 second, there is less motion blur between images than there would have been if shot at 24 frame/s with a 180° shutter (i.e., 1/48 second exposure time). Optical flow is used to introduce motion blur between frames, mimicking the motion blur present when shooting the standard 180° shutter angle. This method of creating motion blur is far more realistic than simple frame blending, which is simple to implement and usually a standard feature in most non-linear editing programs.

The optical flow method also works with 30p footage and is currently the best option for 30p to 24p conversion.

=== 60i to 24p slow-motion conversions ===
==== Using Adobe After Effects ====
This method requires the use of Adobe After Effects and applies to any interlaced material. It uses all of the temporal information in 50i or 60i footage to create the equivalent of a slow motion sequence shot at 50 or 60 frames per second, respectively. It also does not require multiple render passes to achieve the effect, avoiding generation loss from multiple compression cycles.

==== Using VirtualDub + AviSynth ====
VirtualDub, along with AviSynth, can be used to perform a 60i to 24p conversion in a similar way to After Effects. AviSynth performs the deinterlacing, then frameserves the 60p half-resolution result to VirtualDub for further processing (specifically, adjusting field height using the field bob filter, resizing back to full resolution and then outputting at 24 frame/s). The reason AviSynth must be used is that VirtualDub cannot split the fields into a 60p sequence on its own, and this technique requires 60p input.

=== Displaying 24p material ===
With NTSC equipment, it is impossible to display a 24p signal directly as the monitors only support the 60i framerate. Hence, pulldown must be added to the 24p material to be displayed. Most editing systems will either add 3:2 pulldown or 2:2:2:4 pulldown. In the 2:2:2:4 pulldown scheme, used as a choice primarily by Apple's Final Cut Pro v7 and earlier, every fourth frame is repeated. This scheme is easier for slower hardware to implement as it requires less processing, but it introduces significant judder due to frame duplication.

In HD production, the HD-SDI interface supports the 24p framerate in addition to the 60i and 50i framerates. Many HD monitors are able to receive a 24p signal (not a 60i signal with pulldown added) and can display the 24p material directly.

For end-user viewing of HD material, many digital formats are offering 24p support. Computer formats such as Windows Media, QuickTime, and RealVideo can play 24p video directly on a computer monitor. Many early NTSC plasma and LCD monitors operated at 60 Hz and only supported 1080i (60i) or 720p (60p) content sources, requiring input signals 24p to be converted by the external source. Later 60 Hz monitors could accept 1080p24 content but employed a 3:2 pulldown to display 24p content, creating judder. Many monitors now support signal processing at 120 Hz or higher, allowing 24p content to be displayed without judder by showing each frame for a fixed number of refresh cycles. For example, a 120 Hz display can show each 24p frame for exactly 5 display frames. This capability is independent of the motion interpolation features that are often associated with 120 Hz+ televisions.

=== 24p compared to 30p ===
As Charles Poynton explains, the 24 frame/s rate is not just a cinema standard, it is also "uniquely suited to conversion to both 50 Hz systems (through 2:2 pulldown, 4% fast) and 59.94 Hz systems (through 2:3 pulldown, 0.1% slow). Choosing a rate other than 24 frame/s would compromise this widely accepted method of conversion, and make it difficult for film producers to access international markets".

== Native 24p ==
=== 24p on DVD ===
MPEG-2 stream on DVDs is capable of storing the 24000 ÷ 1001 frames losslessly packing them into fields in 30 ÷ 1001 interlaced stream using soft telecine flags. Most of movies are thus laid to disc as a 24000 ÷ 1001 soft telecined stream. With a progressive-scan DVD player and a progressive display, such as an HDTV, the inverse telecine is applied and progressive frames are restored. There is no conversion to an interlaced format, which eliminates the appearance of any interlace or deinterlacing artifacts. When displayed on a back then standard NTSC TV (which only displays 60i), the DVD player will read soft telecine flags and repeat frames, applying interlace to the signal.

In traditional back-then television broadcast and VHS, the video stream has 3:2 pulldown already added. This material could not have been displayed progressively without the resolution loss of deinterlacing, unless the deinterlacer has accurate cadence detection and the resulting frame rate was two times higher than the frame rate of DVD.

Soft telecine flags can be applied to only some portions of a stream. What that means is that part of the movie is progressive and should be inverse telecined and part of the movie is interlaced and should be deinterlaced or presented on an interlaced display. That makes the movie variable frame rate (VFR). Moreover, even more complicated cadences can be present on DVDs and those should be also correctly handled.

=== 24p video production ===
24p is also used directly in video acquisition. The most prolific use of this has been with HDTV and digital cinema.

In 2002, Panasonic released the Prosumer DV camera AG-DVX100 (followed by the updated models AG-DVX100A in 2004 and AG-DVX100B in 2005). This camera was the first DV camera that could switch between different frame rates, including 60i, 30p, and 24p with a choice between the 2:3:3:2 or 3:2 pulldown schemes. The 24p feature on the camera produces film-like video that is preferred by many narrative filmmakers. Canon soon followed suit with the Canon XL-2, offering the same frame rates and pulldown choices as the DVX100.

Following the success of the DVX100, in December, 2005, Panasonic released the Panasonic AG-HVX200, which offers 24p HD at the sub-$10,000 level. Essentially an HD version of the DVX100 series,independent filmmakers became a major section of its userbase, due to the increased resolution, approaching that of standard 35mm motion picture film (indeed, by 2005 a number of feature films has been shot almost entirely in HD video). It is also noteworthy that the camera records its footage to static P2 memory cards instead of tape, including metadata. This signified a radical change in the video editing workflow.

For recording 24p to tape in formats which typically do not support 24p, such as DV, options include PsF (Progressive segmented Frame), 2:3 Pulldown and advanced pulldown.

Many music videos and television series today are shot with 24p video.

=== 23.976p ===
Some 24p productions, especially those made only for NTSC TV and video distribution (e.g., in Canada or the USA), actually have a frame rate of 24000 ÷ 1001, or 23.9̅7̅6̅0̅2̅3̅ frames per second. Many use the term "24p" as a shorthand for this frame rate, since "23.976" does not roll off the tongue as easily. This is because the "30 frame/s" frame rate of NTSC is actually 30/100.1%, also referred to as 29.97 frame/s – this frame rate is matched when video at 23.976 frame/s has a 3:2 pulldown applied. Similarly, 60i is shorthand for 60/100.1% fields per second. Some NLE programs may refer to 23.976 as 23.98, causing a small amount of confusion.

Note that with 23.976 fps time code, the "second" counter is still increased after 24 frames, even though 24 frames add up to slightly more than a real second. When working with other time sources, confusion can arise since a "second" in 23.976 fps time code notation is slightly longer than a real second; it is 1.001 (24 × 1 ÷ (24000 ÷ 1001)) seconds long. In other words, when a time code was reached of 00:16:40:00, this does not mean the video has played for 16 real minutes and 40 real seconds (1000 seconds), but that it has actually played for exactly 16 minutes and 41 seconds (1001 seconds).

Nevertheless, even in NTSC regions, film productions are often shot at exactly 24 frame/s (this is called integer frame rate), especially for DCI. This can be a source of confusion and technical difficulties. 4K Blu-rays for Europe also often use 24.000 frame rate.

Material is treated as normal video, since the slightly differing frame rates can be problematic for video and audio sync. However, this is not a problem if the video material is merely treated as a carrier for material which is known by the editing system to be "true" 24 frame/s, and audio is recorded separately from moving images, as is normal film practice.

An added technical problem is that the popular Matroska (.mkv) video container format allows novice users to declare that 23.976 video is 24.000, and this can result in codec conversion errors with concomitant video stuttering (due to frame "dropping" and "cloning") and loss of audio sync. On the other hand, some Netflix originals are encoded in 24.000 (such as The Witcher), which is problematic to play on some devices (e.g., via Apple TV, which was fixed 3 years later by Apple, and Xbox Series X).

=== 24p in high definition disc formats ===
Both HD DVD and Blu-ray Disc support the 24p frame rate, but technical implementations of this mode are different among the two formats. Blu-ray Disc supports both 24.000p or 23.976p with its native timing, while HD DVD uses 60i timing for 24p (replacing "missing" frames with "repeat field flags", the same as in DVD-Video).

=== Confusion with 23p, 29p, 59p, 119p in Windows ===
Old menus on Windows 10 used 23p for 24 ÷ 1.001, just like 29 for 30 ÷ 1.001, 59p for 60 ÷ 1.001 and 119p for 120 ÷ 1.001. Integer frame rates were just 24, 30, 60, 120. This was corrected in Windows 10 20H2, where in new display settings menu actual 23.976, 29.970, 59.940 and 119.880 are used.

== Disadvantages ==
In general, 24 frames-per-second video has more trouble with fast camera motion than other, higher frame rates, sometimes showing a "strobe" or "choppy" motion, just like 24 frame/s film will if shot as if it is video, without slower camera panning and zooming motion. It is therefore not well-suited for programming requiring spontaneous camera action or "reality" camerawork. Nevertheless, effective "smoothing" high frame rate upscalers were created; the latest generation of those on AI do not introduce artifacts in frames.

== Future ==
Digital cinema equipment is now capable of handling much higher frame rates, such as 48p, 60p and 120p frame rates even in 3D, along with the traditional 24p. 3D in Blu-ray is still only 24p max. 48p has twice the motion resolution of 24p, but also requires more bandwidth, data storage, and potentially illumination level. Peter Jackson's three part film The Hobbit is a production that makes use of the 48p frame rate, but 48p was never used on Blu-ray or streaming platforms, only in cinemas. Other movies, however, have been released at higher framerates on Blu-ray (such as Billy Lynn's Long Halftime Walk).

Some current, best-of-breed professional video cameras provide 120 frame/s progressive capture, which is 5 times 24p and can be converted to 24p, 30p, 50i, and 60i/p with editing options and precision in motion shots.

== See also ==
- Filmizing
- Film look
- Digital Cinema Initiatives
