= Combined Community Codec Pack =

Collection of video compression filters

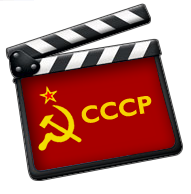
- Stable release: 2015-10-18 / October 18, 2015; 10 years ago
- Preview release: 2015-10-25 beta / October 25, 2015; 10 years ago
- Operating system: Microsoft Windows
- Type: Video codec/audio codec
- License: Freeware
- Website: www.cccp-project.net

The Combined Community Codec Pack (CCCP) is a collection of codecs packed for Microsoft Windows, designed originally for the playback of anime fansubs. The CCCP was developed and maintained by members of various fansubbing groups.

The name is a pun on the name of the Soviet Union; namely, the Cyrillic version of the abbreviation of its full name in Russian (Сою́з Сове́тских Социaлисти́ческих Респу́блик). As part of the joke, the project's logo features the hammer and sickle and star from the Flag of the Soviet Union.

The CCCP was last updated on October 18, 2015. There are more up-to-date alternatives.

== Purpose ==
CCCP was created to fulfill the following:

- Alleviate the major problems caused by conflicting codec packs
- Provide a video media playback standard for the anime community
- Be capable of playing back most common video media files and formats
- Be easy to install and uninstall — even for users with no technical knowledge

The pack is small and compact, containing only what is needed for most videos; it intentionally disables support for many codecs it considers unnecessary. It thus can potentially avoid problems caused by inappropriate combinations of filters by providing an all-inclusive playback solution. To view a CCCP-approved video, one must simply theoretically uninstall all other codec packs and install the CCCP. This philosophy leads to some disadvantages; since many formats are not enabled by default, they have to be manually toggled by the user if needed. Additionally, unlike many competing packs, CCCP is designed around decoding rather than encoding, and as such doesn't include many video encoders that other packs do.

The CCCP is made only for the Microsoft Windows operating system and works with Windows XP/Vista/7/8/10. The last release to support Windows 2000 is 2010-10-10; the last release to support Windows 98/Me is 2007-02-22.

== Reception ==
In 2006, On2 began recommending the CCCP as a simple decoding solution to feed video and audio to their Flix encoding application. The CCCP staff recommends to not use On2's included registry patch, but rather turn on or off any necessary codecs within the CCCP settings menu. In 2009, the German C't magazine recommended CCCP as the only trustworthy codec pack available today.

== Technical details ==
=== Contents ===
Note: Installing all of these separately will not have the same effect as installing the CCCP because the Media Player Classic Home Cinema is customized and so are all of the components' settings.

- Gabest's FLV Splitter
- Haali Media Splitter
- LAV filters
- Media Player Classic Home Cinema lite (custom build)
- xy-VSFilter

CCCP adds Video for Windows (VFW) codecs and DirectShow filters to the system, so that DirectShow/VFW based players like MPC, Winamp, and Windows Media Player will use them automatically.

=== Supported formats ===
- Container formats: AVI, OGM, MKV, MP4, FLV, 3GP and TS
- Video codecs: H.262/MPEG-2 Part 2, Generic MPEG-4 ASP (3ivx, lavc, etc.), DivX, XviD, H.264/MPEG-4 AVC, WMV9, FLV1, and Theora
- Audio codecs: MP1, MP2, MP3, AC3, DTS, AAC, Vorbis, LPCM, FLAC, TTA and WavPack

=== Notable formats not natively supported ===
- Nullsoft Streaming Video .nsv
- QuickTime .qt .mov (Can be played back with CCCP's MPC by installing the official QuickTime software or QuickTime Alternative)
- RealMedia .rm .rmvb (Can be played back with CCCP's MPC by installing the official RealPlayer software or Real Alternative)

== See also ==
- Comparison of video codecs
- ffdshow
- QuickTime Alternative
- Real Alternative
- Media Player Classic
- K-Lite Codec Pack
- Perian (A similar bundle for Mac OS X)
