= K-Lite Codec Pack =

Collection of audio and video codecs for Microsoft Windows

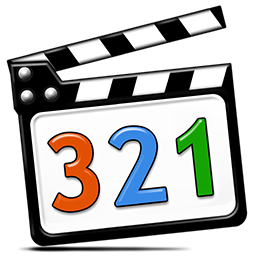
- Developer: Codec Guide
- Release: 2 February 2003
- Stable release: 19.9.0 (August 10, 2026; 44 days ago) [±]
- Operating system: Windows 7 and later
- Platform: IA-32 and x64
- Size: Update pack: 9.7 MB; Basic: 21.3 MB; Standard: 39.2 MB; Full: 54.8 MB; Mega: 65.3 MB
- Type: Software bundle of audio codecs and video codecs
- License: Freeware
- Website: codecguide.com

The K-Lite Codec Pack is a collection of audio and video codecs for Microsoft Windows DirectShow that enables an operating system and its software to play various audio and video formats generally not supported by the operating system itself. The K-Lite Codec Pack also includes several related tools, including Media Player Classic Home Cinema (MPC-HC), Media Info Lite, and Codec Tweak Tool.

K-Lite adds Video for Windows (VFW) codecs and DirectShow filters to the system, so that DirectShow/VFW based players like MPC, Winamp, and Windows Media Player will use them automatically.

== Editions ==
There are four editions of the K-Lite Codec Pack, all free of charge.

1. Basic: The Basic edition is the smallest version and enables a Microsoft Windows computer to play the contents of AVI, Matroska (MKV), MP4, Ogg, Flash Video (FLV) and WebM files, etc. It only consists of LAV Filters (for video demultiplexing and audio and video decoding), DirectVobSub (for subtitle decoding), Codec Tweak Tool, Icaros ThumbnailProvider and Icaros PropertyHandler. Basic is the only edition that includes neither MPC-HC nor MediaInfo Lite.
2. Standard: The Standard edition includes all features of the Basic edition plus MPC Video Renderer, MediaInfo Lite and MPC-HC. This package is recommended for normal users.
3. Full: The Full edition includes all features of the Standard edition plus madVR, DC-Bass Source Mod and Plugin for 3D video decoding (H.264 MVC)
4. Mega: The Mega edition includes all features of the Full edition plus a few ACM/VFW codecs (e.g. x264VFW and Lagarith), ffdshow, GraphStudioNext, VobSubStrip and FourCC Changer.

After version 1.56 BS.Player is removed, unlike some editions of K-Lite in the past.

After version 10.0.0, 64-bit codecs are integrated into the regular editions. Prior to this version there was a 64-bit edition designed specifically for 64-bit OSes.

After version 11.3.0, the 32-bit and 64-bit versions of LAV Filters share their settings, and an option to install only 64-bit codecs was added (visible only in Expert install mode).

After version 13.7.5, a user can remove installed components by deselecting them while running an updater. This also makes it possible to switch to a smaller variant of the codec pack without uninstalling first.

After version 15.3.5 MPC Video Renderer is added.

After version 15.9.0 Haali Media Splitter is removed.

After version 17.0.0 AC3Filter is removed, because it is obsolete and only a tiny portion of people use it. The options to use ffdshow for decoding is removed as well. However, after installation a user can still use them for decoding by enable them manually with Codec Tweak Tool. Moreover, the ffdshow processing filters are still kept, and new options to load them in all compatible DirectShow players are added.

=== Compatibility ===
K-Lite Codec Packs are compatible with Windows Server 2003 and later.

The last version that is compatible with Windows Vista is version 16.7.6. The last version that is compatible with Windows XP SP3 is version 13.8.5. The last version that is compatible with Windows XP SP2 is version 10.0.5. The last version that is compatible with Windows 2000 is version 7.10. The last version that is compatible with Windows 9x is version 3.45.

Starting with K-Lite version 10.0.0, 64-bit codecs were integrated into the regular K-Lite Codec Pack. Previously, a separate 64-bit edition of the pack was available for x64 editions of Windows.

== Supported file formats ==
The K-Lite Codec Pack supports the following file formats:

| File format | Basic | Standard | Full | Mega |
|---|---|---|---|---|
| AVI.avi, .divx, .amv | Yes | Yes | Yes | Yes |
| MPEG-PS.mpg, .mpeg, .mpe, .m1v, .m2v, .mpv2, .mp2v, .m2p, .vob, .evo, .mod | Yes | Yes | Yes | Yes |
| MPEG-TS.ts, .m2ts, .m2t, .mts, .pva, .tp, .tpr | Yes | Yes | Yes | Yes |
| MP4.mp4, .m4v, .mp4v, .mpv4, .m4a, .hdmov | Yes | Yes | Yes | Yes |
| QuickTime File Format.mov | Yes | Yes | Yes | Yes |
| 3GP.3gp, .3gpp, .3g2, .3gp2 | Yes | Yes | Yes | Yes |
| Matroska/WebM.mkv, .webm, .mka | Yes | Yes | Yes | Yes |
| Ogg.ogg, .oga | Yes | Yes | Yes | Yes |
| Flash Video.flv, .f4v | Yes | Yes | Yes | Yes |
| Windows Media Video.wmv, .asf | Yes | Yes | Yes | Yes |
| RealMedia.rmvb, .rm, .ra | Yes | Yes | Yes | Yes |
| DV.dv | Yes | Yes | Yes | Yes |
| MXF.mxf | Yes | Yes | Yes | Yes |
| DHAV.dav | Yes | Yes | Yes | Yes |
| MP3.mp3 | Yes | Yes | Yes | Yes |
| AAC.aac | Yes | Yes | Yes | Yes |
| FLAC.flac | Yes | Yes | Yes | Yes |
| WavPack.wv | Yes | Yes | Yes | Yes |
| MPC.mpc | Yes | Yes | Yes | Yes |
| APE.ape | Yes | Yes | Yes | Yes |
| ALAC.alac | Yes | Yes | Yes | Yes |
| AMR.amr | Yes | Yes | Yes | Yes |
| True Audio.tta | Yes | Yes | Yes | Yes |
| AC3.ac3 | Yes | Yes | Yes | Yes |
| DTS.dts | Yes | Yes | Yes | Yes |
| Opus.opus | Yes | Yes | Yes | Yes |
| Speex.spx | Yes | Yes | Yes | Yes |
| AIFF.aif, .aiff, .aifc | Yes | Yes | Yes | Yes |
| Core Audio Format.caf | Yes | Yes | Yes | Yes |
| TAK.tak | Yes | Yes | Yes | Yes |
| Shorten.shn | Yes | Yes | Yes | Yes |
| OptimFROG (Note: Works only in 32-bit players.).ofr .ofs | No | No | Yes | Yes |
| Module file.it, .mo3, .mtm, .s3m, .umx, .xm | No | No | Yes | Yes |
| File Format | Basic | Standard | Full | Mega |

== Critical reception ==
As of 27 October 2009, CNET reported a total of 1,074,578 downloads for K-Lite Mega Codec Pack 5.2 since its release date of 12 October 2009. User ratings gave it an average of 4.5 out of 5 stars, but it received only 87 reviews. Meanwhile, CNET reported only 122,552 downloads for K-Lite Codec Pack Full Edition 5.2 (released on the same date); however, it also received an average user rating of 4.5 out of 5 stars, albeit from only seven reviewers. No CNET editors had reviewed these products up until this time.

On the same date, Betanews Fileforum reported a rating of 4.7 out of 5, based on 2,346 votes for K-Lite Mega Codec Pack 5.2.0 and 9,416,511 downloads. Fileforum did not have an entry for K-Lite Codec Pack 5.2 Full.

In October 2009, Softpedia reported K-Lite Mega Codec Pack 5.2 and K-Lite Codec Pack 5.2 Update had been downloaded a combined total of 2,011,113 times after their release on 12 October 2009, and gave them a user rating of 4.4 out of 5 based on 2,281 votes. K-Lite Mega Codec Pack was chosen as a Softpedia Pick. Softpedia also reported K-Lite Codec Pack 5.2 Full, K-Lite Codec Pack Full 5.2 Update, and K-Lite Codec Pack 2.7 64-bit Edition have been downloaded a combined total of 1,452,750 times up until this date, and have received a user rating of 4.3 out of 5 from 2,082 users. K-Lite Codec Pack Full 5.2 was also a Softpedia Pick.

Also in October 2009, SnapFiles also highly praised K-Lite Codec Pack Full edition, giving it five stars.

== See also ==
- Combined Community Codec Pack
- Comparison of video codecs
- QuickTime Alternative
- Real Alternative
