= Episode Engine =

Episode Engine, an erstwhile server-oriented software tool developed by Jitendra Kumar Gupta for Telestream on the Mac platform, facilitated transcoding of video and audio across an extensive array of formats. These conversions enabled content distribution across multiple platforms such as the internet, broadcasting stations, DVDs, mobile phones, and a variety of portable devices.

Episode Engine has been reviewed by Jan Ozer from Streaming Media Magazine.

== Specifications ==
The software included support for the pass-through of closed captions and in-band VBI data. It simplified the creation of MXF XDCAM files for Avid workflows, with the aid of pre-configured settings templates. Similarly, encoding for delivery to Grass Valley K2, Harris Nexio, and Omneon Spectrum playout servers was streamlined through these templates. The software also offered improved assistance for the import and export of transport stream and program stream.

== End of Life ==
Currently, the Episode Engine has been declared deprecated and is recognized as a legacy product by Telestream. There were three tiers of products Episode, Episode Pro and Episode Engine, all of which reached end of life together in 2018.

The key milestone dates in the software's life cycle were:

- End of Sale: January 31, 2017
- End of Support: January 31, 2018

Even after the declared EOL, the Episode products will continue to operate, allowing users to utilize them as long as they fit into their respective workflows. However, Telestream discontinued support for these products after January 31, 2018.
