= QTA =

QTA may refer to:

- Quidditch Through the Ages
- QuickTime Alternative
