= WMV HD =

Windows Media Video High Definition
- Filename extension: .wmv
- Internet media type: video/x-ms-wmv
- Uniform Type Identifier (UTI): com.microsoft.windows-?media-wmv
- Developed by: Microsoft
- Type of format: video file format

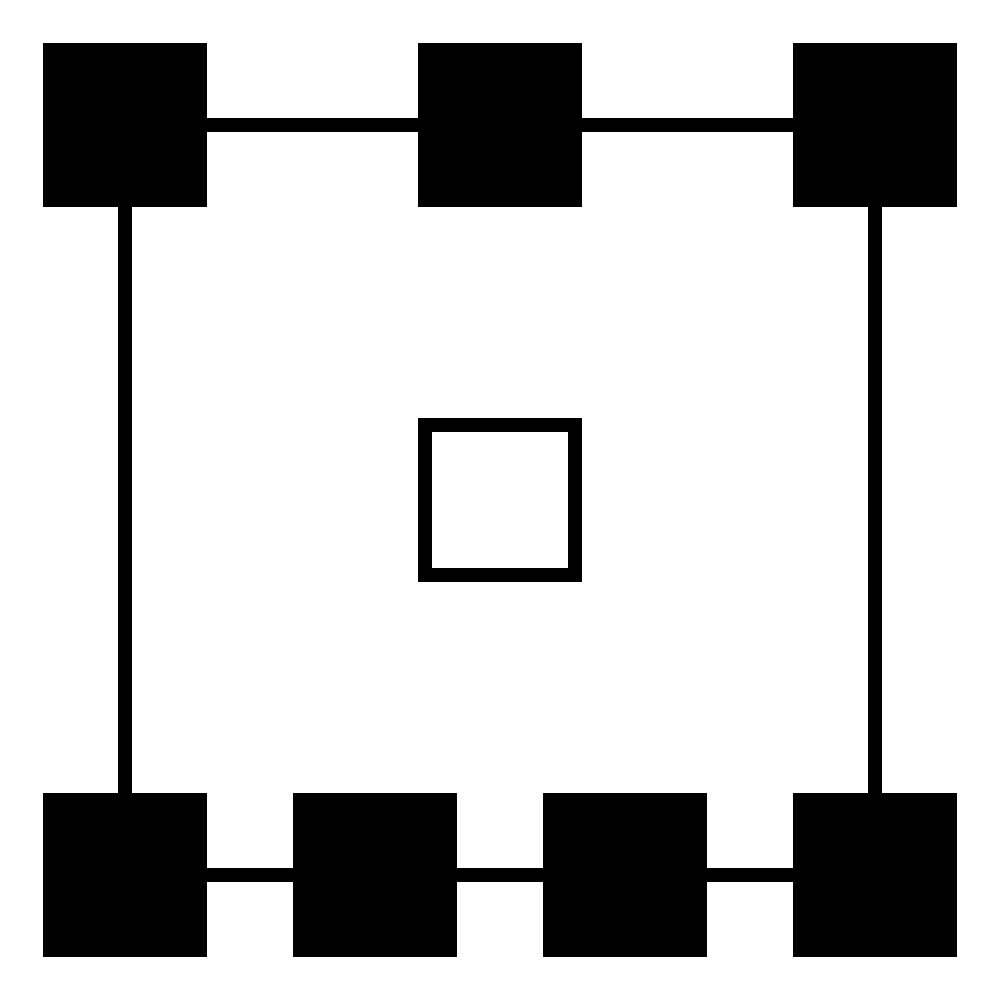
Label for 7.1 extended surround sound

Windows Media High Definition Video (WMV HD) is the marketing name for high definition videos encoded using Microsoft Windows Media Video 9 codecs. These low-complexity codecs make it possible to watch high definition movies in 1280×720 (720p) or 1920×1080 (1080p) resolutions on many modern personal computers running Microsoft Windows XP or Windows Vista, although the hardware requirements are steep. Microsoft's Xbox 360 and Sony's PlayStation 3 video game consoles can also play WMV HD.

WMV HD isn't a standalone video codec nor a special modification of the WMV9 codec. As of April 2006, all existing WMV HD titles are encoded using the VC-1 compliant Windows Media Video 9 (FourCC: WMV3) codec conforming to VC-1 Main Profile @ High Level specification. It is possible that in the future Microsoft will take advantage of the new VC-1 Advanced Profile codec dubbed Windows Media Video Advanced Profile (FourCC: WVC1) to encode WMV HD videos.

A number of WMV9-encoded high definition movie titles have been made commercially available on DVD-ROM discs, either as standalone discs or supplements to the regular DVD-Video titles. The technology was considered a stepping stone to true high definition optical disc formats (HD DVD and Blu-ray Disc) and Microsoft never intended the discs to be played on anything but personal computers. Most commercially sold WMV HD titles are copy protected using Microsoft Windows Media DRM technology. The licensing terms of DRM protected titles are determined by the content providers and not Microsoft Corporation. The soundtracks are commonly encoded using the Windows Media Audio Professional codec, often featuring 5.1 or 7.1 multichannel sound. The video and audio streams are encapsulated in Advanced Systems Format files.

== Compatibility ==
WMV HD has been touted for its ease of use, since functionality to convert to WMV HD has been built into Windows Movie Maker, it has allowed people to convert their home videos to WMV HD as well as any commercial releases they may have received. The file system will work on a PC with the settings listed above, as well as an Xbox 360, at 1080p/1080i.

== Encoders ==
Windows Media Video HD can be encoded with a variety of programs, such as Windows Media Encoder, Windows Movie Maker, and Microsoft Expression Encoder. When encoding, it has been recommended by these programs that you use the original file for best results; at times, re-encoding an already-coded movie can lead to subpar results.

== Movies on WMV HD DVD-ROM ==
- Enron: The Smartest Guys in the Room
- One Last Thing...
- Standing in the Shadows of Motown
- Step Into Liquid (bonus disc)
- Speed (1984 film) (bonus disc)
- Terminator 2: Judgment Day - Extreme Edition (disc 2; theatrical version)
- Total Recall (released in Denmark, Germany and Norway)
- The War Within
- Pirates (third disc)
- Immortal ad Vitam (3-disc edition)
- Deep Red (Italian Medusa 2-disc edition)
- Muffin Man HD Edition (2-disc edition)

== See also ==
- DivX HD—the main competitor to WMV HD
