= FlipFactory =

FlipFactory from Telestream is a video transcoding and workflow automation application. It enables the transfer of media and metadata files between professional video systems, including catch servers, broadcast servers, edit systems, streaming and distribution servers, storage area networks and digital asset management systems.

FlipFactory is used by News Digital Media, and Australian News Corp, to do all their video transcoding. BBDO New York also uses FlipFactory from Telestream to help them go tapeless.

As of December 2016, FlipFactory is no longer available or supported; Telestream have a new package called "Vantage."

== Specifications ==
- Avid and Dolby E workflow integration
- Pass through and decoding of Dolby E for broadcast and editing
- Avid workflows ingest and deliver media files and metadata in and out of Avid TransferManager Interplay networks
- Microsoft IIS7 Smooth Streaming
- Loudness correction for ads
- HD VANC data preservation and insertion
- H.264 closed caption support for IPTV workflows
