= Video renderer =

A video renderer is software that processes a video file and sends it sequentially to the video display controller card for display on a computer screen. An example of a video renderer, is the VMR-7 that was used by Microsoft's DirectShow. An example of a UNIX video renderer is the one container within GStreamer.

Commonly used video renderers are:

- Enhanced Video Renderer
- VMR9 Renderless
- Haali's Video Renderer
- Madvr Video Renderer
- JRVR, a part of JRiver Media Center

== See also ==
- Rendering (computer graphics)
