= Dolby E =

Audio compression technology for AES3

Dolby E logo.

Dolby E is a lossy audio compression and decoding technology developed by Dolby Laboratories that allows 6 to 8 channels of audio to be compressed into an AES3 digital audio stream that can be stored as a standard stereo pair of digital audio tracks.

Up to six channels, such as a 5.1 mix, can be recorded as 16-bit Dolby E data. However, if more than six channels are required, such as 5.1 plus a stereo LtRt, the AES3 data must be formatted as 20-bit audio. This increases capacity to eight channels.

Dolby E should never reach home viewers, as it is intended for use during post-production when moving multichannel material between production facilities or broadcasters. It is decoded prior to transmission.

It is very important to ensure that a Dolby E stream is never played through monitors or headphones without decoding. Undecoded Dolby E data will be converted to analog as full scale (0 dBFS) digital noise that can easily damage loudspeakers or hearing. Unambiguous media labeling is essential to avoid this.

== Products ==
Dolby E encoding and decoding is implemented using commercially available hardware or software.

=== Hardware ===
- Dolby DP571
- Dolby DP572
- Dolby DP568
- Dolby DP580
- Dolby DP591
- Dolby DP600
- Dolby DP600C

=== Software ===
- FFmpeg (only decoding)
- Avisynth (only decoding)
- Emotion Systems 'eNGINE'
- Minnetonka Audio 'AudioTools Server'
- Minnetonka Audio SurCode for Dolby E
- Neyrinck SoundCode For Dolby E
