= Wirecast =

Live video software

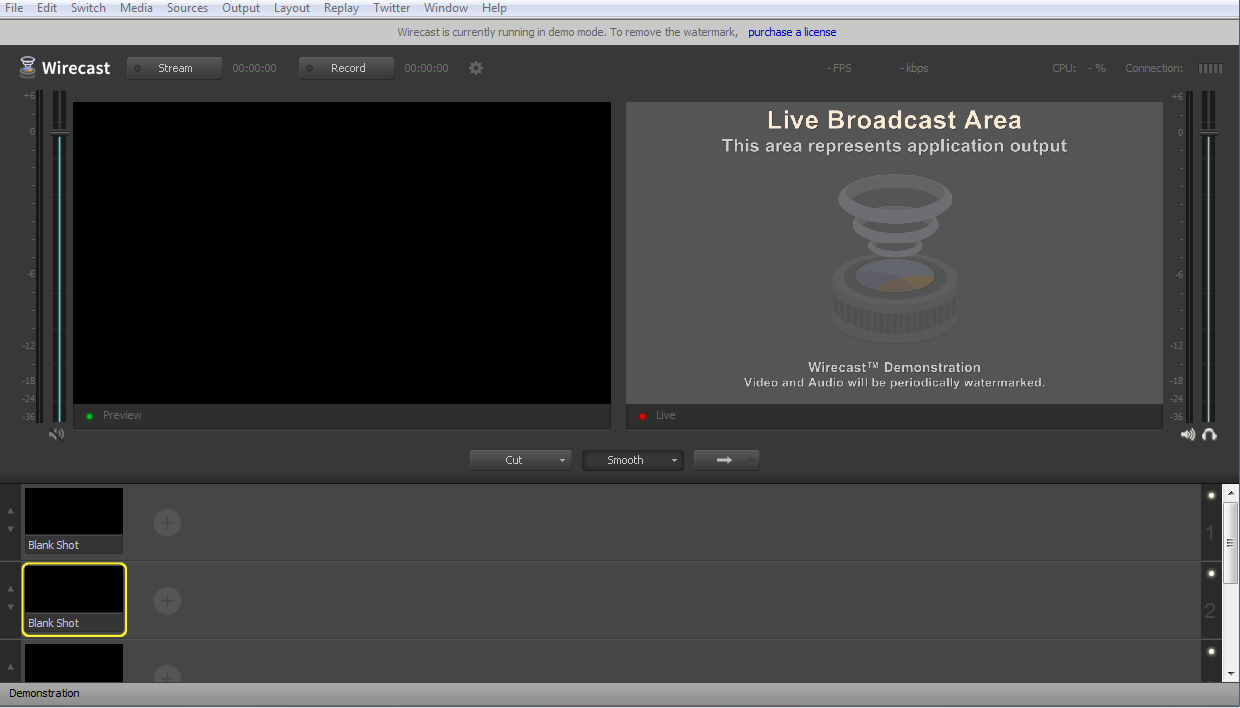
- Wirecast 6.0.7
- Developer: Telestream
- Release: 2004; 22 years ago
- Stable release: 16.4.1 / March 14, 2025; 16 months ago
- Written in: C, C++, Objective-C
- Operating system: Windows, macOS
- Type: Live streaming
- License: Commercial proprietary software
- Website: www.wirecast.io/en/

Wirecast is a live video streaming production tool by Telestream. It allows users to create live or on-demand broadcasts for the web.

Wirecast is a software video switcher, controlling real-time switching between multiple live video cameras, while dynamically mixing in other source media, such as QuickTime movies, music, audio and slides to create professional broadcast productions for live or on-demand distribution on the web.

== Specifications ==
- Can broadcast to multiple services at once
- Support for multiple cameras
- Chroma key (blue/green screen)
- Scene transitions
- Built-in lower-third titling
- Desktop Presenter - makes Macintosh or Windows Desktop available as a source
- H.264
- 3D Graphics
- QuickTime Streaming Server Support
- Keynote Integration
- Multiple Layers
- Multiple Broadcast Support, when ready to go live, it provides direct integration with a number of streaming service providers.
- A direct integration with Limelight Networks, adds support for Flash streaming
- Adds a built-in streaming service access from Ustream.
- Encoding support for Nvidia NVENC and Intel Quick Sync Video
- Support for Network Device Interface
- Rendezvous Videoconferencing feature allows users to bring in live video feeds from multiple sources, including remote locations.
