= Frameserver =

A frameserver is any program that acts as a media source in the process called frameserving, which transfers digital video data from one computer program to another without intermediate files. The program that receives the data – the frameclient – could be any type of video application.

The process is controlled by the frameclient: the frameclient requests audio/video frames and the frameserver serves them. The client can request frames in any order, allowing it to pause or jump to an arbitrary frame, just as a media player does with a file on disk. The client is most commonly a media encoder, a non-linear editing system, or a media player.

== Frameservers ==
- AviSynth
- VirtualDub
- VapourSynth
- Debugmode FrameServer

== See also ==
- Client–server model
