= Windows Media Encoder =

Discontinued media encoder by Microsoft

- Developer: Microsoft
- Stable release: 9.0 / January 7, 2003; 23 years ago
- Operating system: Microsoft Windows
- Type: Video and audio encoding software
- License: Freeware

Windows Media Encoder (WME) is a discontinued, freeware media encoder developed by Microsoft which enables content developers to convert or capture both live and prerecorded audio, video, and computer screen images to Windows Media formats for live and on-demand delivery. It is the successor of NetShow Encoder. The download page reports that it is not supported on Windows 7. WME has been replaced by a free version of Microsoft Expression Encoder. The Media 8 Encoding Utility is still listed. WME was available in both 32-bit and 64-bit versions.

Windows Media Encoder 9 can encode video using Windows Media Video version 7, 8 or 9. Audio encoding uses a number of Windows Media Audio version 9.2 or version 10 (if the version 10 codecs are installed) profiles and a Windows Media Audio 9 Voice speech codec. Content can also be created as uncompressed audio or video.

Windows Media Encoder 9 enables two-pass encoding to optimize quality for on-demand (streamed or download-and-play) content. It also supports variable bitrate (VBR) encoding for download-and-play scenarios. True VBR can be applied over the entire duration of a high-motion sequence, ensuring the highest quality. This version also enables scripted encoding with the wmcmd.vbs VBScript file, allowing content developers to encode large numbers of prerecorded media files. Bundled with the program are the applications Windows Media File Editor, Windows Media Profile Editor, and Windows Media Stream Editor.

The GUI encoder application is actually a "wrapper" of the encoder itself. Developers can write their own applications using Visual Studio to perform the same functions found in the application. These applications can be used to automate audio and video production. An SDK is also available.

With the removal of Windows Media DRM in the Windows 10 Anniversary Update, Windows Media Encoder 9 is no longer compatible with the current version of Windows as of May 2017.

== Versions ==
- NetShow Encoder 3.0
- NetShow Encoder 3.01 (comes with PowerPoint 2000)
- Windows Media Encoder 4.0 (also as part of the Windows Media Tools) Windows Media Tools 4.1 was the last release for Windows 95 and Windows NT 4.0.
- Windows Media Encoder 7.1 (for Windows 98, Windows Me and Windows 2000)
- Windows Media 8 Encoding Utility (command line) for Windows 98, Windows Me and Windows 2000
- Windows Media Encoder 9
- Windows Media Encoder x64 Edition (based on Windows Media 10 SDK)

Windows Media Encoder Studio Edition was a separate planned version of Windows Media Encoder 9 with support for segment encoding and multiple audio channels. After beta 1, it was eventually cancelled. Microsoft later released the commercial application, Expression Encoder as part of its Expression Studio suite.

== See also ==
- WMV HD
- Windows Media Player
- Windows Media Services
- Windows Movie Maker
- Microsoft Expression Encoder
- Comparison of screencasting software
