= Video pointer =

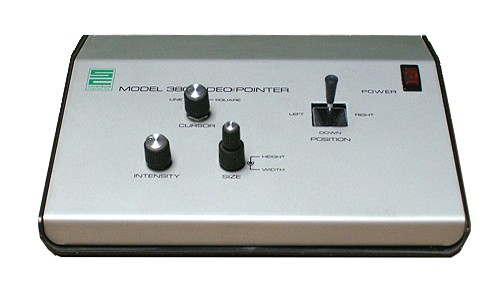
Video Pointer - front view

Video pointer is a device used to highlight or mark a specific location on a video display. The device is often equipped with a video input and output ports and a joystick to manipulate the motion of a pointer-cursor. Video pointers utilize video overlay technology to superimpose an image of a pointer-cursor over another video stream. Video pointers may also be equipped with other features such as selection of the type and shape of the cursor, image intensity control, and cursor size and color control.

Video pointers are commonly used in news and sports broadcasts, video presentations, video surveillance, medical documentary applications, etc.

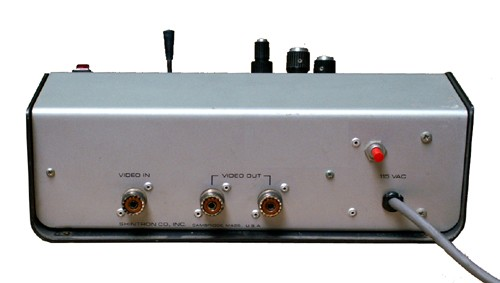
Video Pointer - back view
