= Ffdshow =

Open-source unmaintained codec library

ffdshow

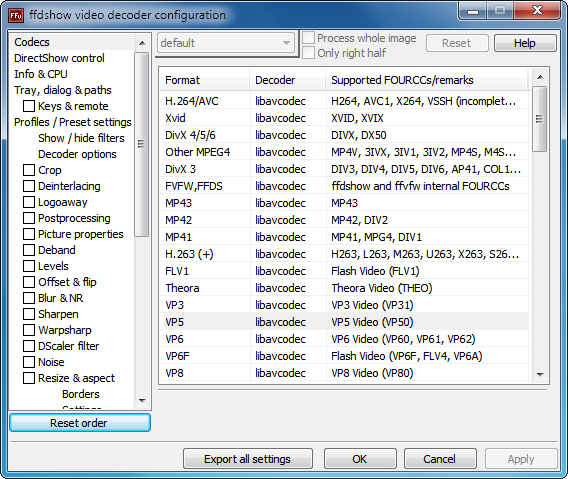
- ffdshow video decoder configuration on Windows 7
- Original authors: Milan Cutka, Peter Ross
- Developers: clsid, XhmikosR, et al.
- Release: 20 May 2002 (original ffdshow); 11 September 2006 (ffdshow tryouts)
- Final release: 1.3.4531 / 28 June 2014; 12 years ago
- Preview release: 1.3.4533 (30 September 2014; 11 years ago) [±]
- Written in: Assembly, C++, C
- Operating system: Windows XP and later
- License: GNU General Public License 2.0
- Website: ffdshow-tryout.sourceforge.net

ffdshow is an open-source unmaintained codec library that is mainly used for decoding of video in the MPEG-4 ASP (e.g. encoded with DivX or Xvid) and H.264/MPEG-4 AVC video formats, but it supports numerous other video and audio formats as well. It is free software released under GNU General Public License 2.0, runs on Windows, and is implemented as a Video for Windows (VFW) codec and a DirectShow filter.

== Installation and configuration ==
ffdshow does not include a media player or container parsers. Instead, after installation of ffdshow, compatible DirectShow or VFW media players such as Media Player Classic, Winamp, and Windows Media Player will use the ffdshow decoder automatically, thus avoiding the need to install separate codecs for the various formats supported by ffdshow. The user configures ffdshow's audio and video settings by launching the ffdshow video decoder configuration program independently of any media player.

For playing transport stream files such as AVC(H.264) an additional mediasplitter should also be installed. There are several free mediasplitters available such as the LAV Filters.

== Format and filter support ==
ffdshow can be configured to display subtitles, to enable or disable various built-in codecs, to grab screenshots, to enable keyboard control, and to enhance movies with increased resolution, sharpness, and many other post-processing video filters. It has the ability to manipulate audio with effects like an equalizer, a Dolby decoder, reverb, Winamp DSP plugins, and more. Some of the postprocessing is borrowed from the MPlayer project and AviSynth filters.

ffdshow uses the libavcodec library and several other free, open source software packages to decode video in most common formats, such as:

- MPEG-4 Part 2 (including video encoded with Xvid, 3ivx, and all versions of DivX).
- Flash Video, H.263 and VP6 (used by sites such as YouTube).
- H.264/AVC, Theora, WMV as well as numerous others.

ffdshow also decodes audio, such as:

- MP3,
- AAC,
- Dolby AC3,
- WMA
- FLAC, and
- Vorbis formats, among others.

The post-processing video filters of ffdshow can be used in video editors such as VirtualDub or AviSynth, by configuring the VFW settings. In these editors, ffdshow can also be used to encode MPEG-4 video compatible with Xvid, DivX, or x264 codecs, as well as lossless video and a few other formats supported by libavcodec.

== History ==
The first versions of ffdshow were published in May 2002, as an alternative to the DivX ;-) 3.11 and DivX 5.02 (which came bundled with Gator) decoders of the time, and as a way to combine the speed and quality of MPlayer with popular Windows video players. It continues to support more formats, new and old, as FFmpeg developers add support for them.

The main developer was Milan Cutka. When he stopped updating the project in 2006, new maintainers opened the ffdshow tryouts as a fork, where bug-fixes, stability fixes, new features, and codec updates continued. Development of ffdshow tryouts was discontinued in 2012 with users recommended to use LAV Filters instead.

== See also ==
- Comparison of video player software
- Open source codecs and containers
