= QuickTime Alternative =

QuickTime Alternative / QT Lite
- Developer(s): KL Software
- Final release: 3.2.2 / September 3, 2010; 15 years ago (QuickTime Alternative); 4.1.0 / December 15, 2010; 14 years ago (QT Lite)
- Operating system: Windows XP Windows Server 2003 Windows Vista Windows Server 2008 Windows 7
- Size: 18.3 MB (QuickTime Alternative); 16.9 MB (QT Lite)
- Available in: English
- Type: Video codec
- License: Freeware
- Website: QuickTime Alternative; QT Lite

QuickTime Alternative is a codec package for Microsoft Windows for playing QuickTime media, normally only playable by the official QuickTime software distribution from Apple Inc. Development has now ceased and the version of the QuickTime codec now lags behind that released by Apple.

== Comparison ==
QuickTime Alternative consists of codec libraries extracted from the official Apple distribution, including the official QuickTime plugin required for playing QuickTime files (.MOV, .QT and others) in web browsers such as Internet Explorer and Mozilla Firefox, and also includes Media Player Classic.

The main functional differences between the official QuickTime distribution and QuickTime Alternative from an end-user standpoint are in feature set, size, and consumption of system resources. QuickTime Alternative is a smaller package and lacks the full complement of software included in Apple QuickTime, including QuickTime Player, PictureViewer, and any QuickTime Pro features. In addition, QuickTime Alternative does not run background processes such as the optional QuickTime Tray Icon from the official distribution.

QT Lite is a stripped-down version of QuickTime Alternative that contains only the base components, and does not install Media Player Classic. It used to be maintained concurrently with QuickTime Alternative.

== History ==
- On March 10, 2006, QuickTime Alternative 1.56 was released, which is the last version based on Apple QuickTime 6.0, and therefore the last version to support Windows 98 and Windows Me.
- On June 28, 2007, QT Lite was introduced. QT Lite 1.1.2 published 2007-11-12 was the last version for Windows 2000, QT Lite 2.0.0 published one day later required Windows XP.
- On September 14, 2007, QuickTime Alternative 1.90 was released, which removes QuickTime Pro functionality and DirectShow filters, both of which were included in prior versions. Based on Apple QuickTime 7.2, QuickTime Alternative 1.95 is the first version that doesn't support Windows 2000 or CPUs without SSE.
- On December 15, 2007, QuickTime Alternative 2.20 was released and it was based on Apple QuickTime 7.3.1.70. From this version upwards support for CPUs without SSE is restored back again.
- On September 3, 2009, QuickTime Alternative 3.2.2 was released. Based on Apple QuickTime 7.6.6.
- On July 15, 2010, both Quicktime Alternative and Real Alternative were removed from their main distribution website, and on July 25, 2010 QT Lite and Real Alternative Lite followed suit. The maintainer of these software packages, CodecGuru, refuses to discuss the reason for the removal, saying "that discussion is not wanted here." CodecGuru also actively deletes or edits any posts on the Codec Guide forum that mention the two codec packs and their removal. Repeated posting about the topic results in users being banned from the forum. CodecGuru stated in a forum post that "There are no links on the site anymore to stimulate the use and development of open-source alternatives, such as VLC and ffdshow, instead of the use of proprietary software."
- On August 16, 2010 QT Lite 4.0.0 was released. Based on Apple QuickTime 7.6.7.
- On December 18, 2010 QT Lite 4.1.0 was released. Based on Apple QuickTime 7.6.9.
- On May 24, 2023, QT Lite 7.7.9 was released. Based on Apple QuickTime 7.7.8
- On July 25, 2010, QT Lite was discontinued by Apple due to security concerns.

== See also ==
- Media Player Classic
- K-Lite Codec Pack
- VLC media player
