= SoundCode =

Neyrinck
- Industry: Audio encoding/compression
- Founder: Paul Neyrinck
- Headquarters: San Francisco, California, United States
- Area served: Worldwide
- Products: SoundCode For Dolby E, SoundCode For Dolby Digital, SoundCode For Broadcast, Mix 51, V-Mon
- Website: www.neyrinck.com

SoundCode is an audio encoding and decoding product line developed by Neyrinck that uses audio encode and decode technologies to convert audio signals from one format to another.

The technologies used include Dolby E and Dolby Digital.
