= Demultiplexer (software) =

Type of software that splits an analog or digital signal into multiple signals

A demultiplexer for digital media files, or media demultiplexer, also called a file splitter by laymen or consumer software providers, is software that demultiplexes individual elementary streams of a media file, e.g., audio, video, or subtitles and sends them to their respective decoders for actual decoding. Media demultiplexers are not decoders themselves, but are format container handlers that separate media streams from a (container) file and supply them to their respective audio, video, or subtitles decoders.

== Notable file splitters ==
- Microsoft AVI splitter - Part of Microsoft Windows.
- Haali Media Splitter - demultiplexes MP4 (MPEG-4), M2TS (MPEG transport stream) and MKV (Matroska) files.
- FLV Splitter - demultiplexes Flash video files.
- Gabest splitter (part of Media Player Classic) - demultiplexes e.g. 3GP, MP4
- LAV Splitter - part of the LAV Filters project (open source DirectShow media splitter and decoders).
- libavformat (part of the FFmpeg project) - demultiplexes many formats e.g. 3GP, ASF, AVI, FLV, SWF, M2TS, MKV, MOV, MP4, MPG, NSV, NUT, Ogg, RM, AIFF, AU, WAV, etc.
  - e.g. used in MPlayer and GOM Player
- libvlc (part of VideoLAN project and VLC Media Player) - demultiplexes many formats e.g. MPEG transport stream, MPEG program stream, MP4, MOV, 3GP, Ogg, OGM, ASF, WMV, WMA, MKV, FLV, etc.
- Nero Splitter
- Ogg DirectShow Filters - demultiplexes Ogg container
- tsMuxeR, using the Demux output option
- MP4Box, command line MP4 multiplexer/demultiplexer with GUIs like My MP4Box

== Playback issues ==
Playback difficulties (such as no playback, no audio, or no video) may result from several or legacy file splitters for a particular file format being installed on an operating system. This causes decoder-to-file-splitter mismatch resulting in playback failure on media players.

== See also ==
- Container format
- Multiplexer
- Multimedia framework
- File spanning
