= AVS Video Editor =

Video editing software

- Developer: Online Media Technologies Ltd.
- Release: September 2003; 22 years ago
- Operating system: Windows 11, Windows 10, Windows 8.1, Windows 8, Windows 7, Windows Vista, Windows XP, Windows Server 2003, Windows Server 2008, Windows Server 2008 R2, Windows Server 2012, Windows Server 2012 R2, Windows Server 2016, Windows Server 2019, Windows Server 2022
- Size: 170 MB
- Available in: 12 languages
- List of languages English, German, French, Spanish, Italian, Japanese, Russian, Dutch, Brazilian Portuguese, Polish, Danish, Chinese
- Type: Video editing software
- Licence: Trialware
- Website: avs4you.com/AVS-Video-Editor.aspx

AVS Video Editor is a video editing software published by Online Media Technologies Ltd. It is a part of AVS4YOU software suite which includes video, audio, image editing and conversion, disc editing and burning, document conversion and registry cleaner programs. It offers the opportunity to create and edit videos with a vast variety of video and audio effects, text and transitions; capture video from screen, web or DV cameras and VHS tape; record voice; create menus for discs, as well as to save them to plenty of video file formats, burn to discs or publish on Facebook, YouTube, Flickr, etc.

== Description ==
=== Interface ===
The layout consists of the timeline or storyboard view, preview pane and media library (transitions, video effects, text or disc menus) collections. The storyboard view shows the sequence of video clips with the transitions between them and used to change the order of clips or add transitions. Timeline view consists of main video, audio, effects, video overlay and text lines for editing. Once on the timeline video can be duplicated, split, muted, frozen, cropped, stabilized, its speed can be slowed down or increased, audio and color corrected.

=== Importing footage ===
Video, audio and image files necessary for video project can be imported into the program from computer hard disk drive. User can also capture video from computer screen, web or mini DV camera, as well as from VHS tape, record voice.

=== Output (web, device, disc, format) ===
AVS Video Editor gives the opportunity to save video to a computer hard drive to one of the video formats: AVI, DVD, Blu-ray, MOV, MP4, M4V, MPEG, WMV, MKV, WebM, M2TS, TS, FLV, SWF, RM, 3GP, GIF, DPG, AMV, MTV; burn to DVD or Blu-ray disc with menus; create a video for mobile players, mobile phones or gaming consoles and upload it right to the device. The most popular devices such as Apple iPod, Apple iPhone, Apple iPad, Sony PSP, Samsung Galaxy, Android and BlackBerry smartphones and tablets are supported. There is also an option to create a video that can be streamed via web and save it into Flash or WebM format or for the popular web services: YouTube, Facebook, Telly (Twitvid), Dailymotion, Flickr and Dropbox.

=== Features ===
- Single and multithread modes: if a computer supports multi-threading, video creation process is performed faster in multithread mode, especially on a multi-core system.
- Customization of the output file settings, such as bitrate, frame rate, frame size, video and audio codecs, etc.
- Transitions - help video clips smoothly go into one another, dissolve or overlap two video or image files.
- Fade in and fade out video and audio files - dissolve a video to and from a blank image, reduce the audio volume at the end of the video and increase at the beginning.
- Slideshow creation - create a presentation of a series of still images.
- Voice recording
- Projects - once a project is created and saved, the next time saving video to some other format will be fast, projects are also used if a user do not have a possibility to create, edit and save video all at once.
- Video overlay option - superpose video image over the video clip that is being edited.
- Disk menu and chapters creation - an option for DVD and Blu-ray video.
- Freeze frame - make a still shot from a video clip.
- Stabilization feature - reduce jittering or blurring caused by shaky motions of a camera.
- Enhanced deinterlacing method - increase video quality for interlaced input file - spots and blurred areas are compensated.
- Scene detection - search and separate one scene of the video from the other.
- Loop DVD and SWF - output SWF and DVD video are played back continuously.
- Caching for processing high definition files - create a duplicate video file smaller in size to use it on the preview window and accelerate processing of HD files.
- Chroma key option - add video overlay half transparent so that only part of it is visible and all the rest disappears to reveal the video underneath.
- Capture video material from DV tapes, VHS tapes, web cameras, etc.
- Movie closing credits - add information on movie editing, e.g. crew, cast, data, etc.
- Creeping line, subtitles, text - add different captions (static and animated), shapes and images to video.
- Speech balloons and other graphic objects - geometrical shapes to highlight an object in the video.
- Zoom effect - magnify or reduce the view of the image.
- Rotate effect - rotate video image at different degrees, e.g. 90, 180, etc.
- Grayscale and old movie effects - create a black and white video image. Old movie adds also scratches, noise, shake and dust to video, as if it's being played on an old projector.
- Blur and sharpen effects - visually smooth and soften an image, or make video image better focused.
- Snow and particles effects - adds snow or various objects (bubbles, flowers, leaves, butterflies etc.) that are moving, flying or falling on the video.
- Pan and zoom
- Timer, countdown effects - add a timepiece that measures or counts down a time interval to the video being edited.
- Snapshots - capture a particular moment of a video clip.
- Sound track replacement - mute audio track from video and add another one.
- Audio amplify, noise removal, equalizer, etc. - make video sound louder, attenuate the noise, change frequency pattern of the audio, make some other audio adjustments.
- Trim and multi-trim options - change video clip duration cutting out unnecessary parts or detect scenes and cut out parts in any place of the video clip.
- Color correction (brightness, temperature, contrast, saturation, gamma, etc.) effects - allow adjustment of tonal range, color, and sharpness of video files.
- Crop scale effect - get rid of mattes that appear after changing aspect ratio of a video file.
- Adjusting the Playback Speed
- Volume and balance - change sound volume in the output video. Change volume value proportion for main video and added soundtrack, completely mute main video audio and leave added soundtrack only, etc.

=== Utilities embedded into AVS Video Editor ===
- AVS Mobile Uploader is used to transfer edited and converted media files to portable devices via Bluetooth, Infrared or USB connection.
- AVS Video Burner is used to burn converted video files to different disc types: CD, DVD, Blu-ray.
- AVS Video Recorder is used to capture video from analog video sources and supports different types of devices: capture card, web camera (webcam), DV camera, HDV camera.
- AVS Video Uploader is used to transfer video files to popular video-sharing websites, like Facebook, Dailymotion, YouTube, Photobucket, TwitVid, MySpace, Flickr.
- AVS Screen Capture is used to capture any actions on the desktop to make presentations or video tutorials more vivid and easily comprehensible.

== Important upgrades ==
The initial release of AVS Video Editor was in 2003 when the program was offered inside AVS software bundles together with AVS Video Tools, AVS Audio Tools and DVD Copy software. In 2005 the program is offered as a part of multifunctional AVS4YOU software suite. AVS Video Editor is frequently updated. The main updates include adding several important features for video editing

| Release date | Description |
|---|---|
| June 2009 | Speed control, audio and color correction, Blu-ray, M2TS, TS video support, multithread usage possibility, Nintendo Wii, Sony PSP and SanDisk Sansa View support |
| August 2010 | Support of GPU technology, user folders in Media Library, Stabilization and Pan and Zoom effects, imported files cashing were added |
| December 2010 | Screen capture utility and personalised DVD menu editing became available, support for Polish language |
| June 2011 | New processing settings (loop DVD option), Gif and Tiff (tif) animation support, merge projects option added, new video effects (Twist, Grid Mozaic, Wide Angle Zoom, Particles, Canvas, Warm Glow, Water Mirror, Color Exchange) and text effect (Star Wars) |
| October 2011 | New video effects (Countdown, Writing Text, Anaglyph 3D) |
| May 2012 | New video effects (Broken Glass, Glass Tile) and text effects (Cappuccino, Papers, Asia, Travel, Sea) |
| November 2012 | Windows 8 compatibility, support for Danish language, countdown effect, WTV format for input, numerous GUI changes, new disc menu styles, bug fixes, improved video recording and video uploading utilities |
| July 2013 | New processing settings (enhanced deinterlacing method and looping in SWF), support for Portuguese language |
| December 2013 | Full HD "Video for slideshow" profile, new Android profiles for Samsung Galaxy S, Galaxy Note and Galaxy Tab, new Apple profiles to convert video for iPhone and iPad, bug fixes |
| October 2014 | 2560x1440 (QHD - 2K) and 3840x2160 (Ultra HD 4K) output video support, numerous GUI changes, improved video recording utility |
| March 2015 | New flat style skin |
| September 2015 | Windows 10 compatibility |
| February 2016 | Check for updates option (manually or automatically), important bug fixes |
| July 2016 | Enhanced memory usage (up to 4 GB for each .exe process in Windows 64-bit), optimized and new profiles, optimized setup wizard, numerous GUI changes |
| January 2017 | New setting: video rendering mode (use video buffer or allow video overlay), enhanced support of video, audio and image formats |
| August 2017 | Support of hardware Intel Media decoder for H.264/AVC and VC-1 in Windows 10 and Windows Server 2016, enhanced support of anamorphic video, enhanced support of TIFF images for slides, new processing settings (frame size step and external AVI codecs), scaling GUI, support of system window frame, improved screen capturing and video recording utilities |
| May 2018 | Optimized and new profiles with higher quality, updated software Intel Media decoder (2012) for H.264/AVC and VC-1, support of frame size 4096x2160 (DCI 4K), enhanced support of AVI files with Motion JPEG (MJPEG) video |
| December 2018 | Support of software decoder for H.265/HEVC and VP9, updated software Intel Media decoder (2017) for H.264/AVC and VC-1, new profiles, new video effects (Arrow and Tilt-shift), new options for Colorize, Particles, Timer and draw video effects |
| March 2019 | Vertical tilt-shift effect, critical bug fixes for video decoding, video output and ActiveX registration |
| April 2019 | Support of NVIDIA CUDA decoder for H.264/AVC, VC-1 and MPEG-2 video, support of hardware/software Intel Media decoder for MPEG-2 video, improved screen capturing utility (higher quality and new buffer mode) |
| July 2019 | Fixes for decoding of AAC and ALAC audio in M4A/MP4/M4V/MOV files, support of MJPEG video in Matroska files, improved support of MP4/M4V/MOV files with 2 'moov' atoms, optimization and fix for image rotation operation, improved installation mode for SCCM |
| November 2019 | Support for Chinese language, profiles for new devices, installer optimization, bug fixes |
| February 2020 | New "Stickers" folder in Media Library with collection of pictures for overlay, automatic recovering of previously deleted "Samples" and "Backgrounds" folders in Media Library, installer optimization, some GUI changes and bug fixes for Media Library |
| March 2020 | Profiles for new devices, secure HTTPS protocol for all URLs in browser, improved support for input anamorphic videos, improved quality for output MPEG, DVD, Blu-ray anamorphic videos, bug fix for fast video playback |
| April 2020 | New stickers, improved screen capture utility, new safe mode, bug fixes |
| July 2020 | Support of video decoding with hardware Intel Media and NVIDIA CUDA decoders for H.265/HEVC, VP8, VP9 video; support of software Intel Media decoder for H.265/HEVC video; enhanced support of MP4/MOV/M4V/3GP files - new specification, Fragmented MP4 (fMP4) and different types of rotated video; optimized video preview; new stickers; enhanced usability and accessibility; bug fixes |

== See also ==
- Windows Movie Maker
- Adobe Premiere Pro
- Sony Vegas Pro
- Final Cut Pro
- HitPaw Online Video Enhance
