= MediaInfo =

Program that displays technical information about media files

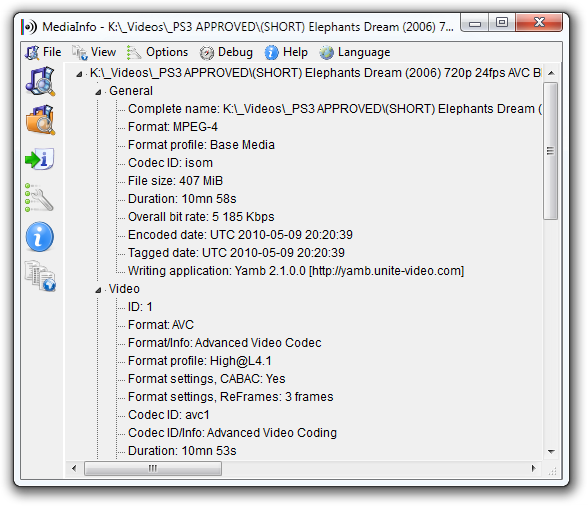
- MediaInfo 0.7.37 graphical user interface running on Windows 7
- Original author: Jérôme Martinez
- Initial release: 28 December 2002; 22 years ago
- Stable release: 25.10 / 6 November 2025; 44 days ago
- Repository: github.com/MediaArea/MediaInfo
- Written in: Pascal, C++
- Operating system: Linux, Microsoft Windows, macOS, Android, iOS
- Size: 4.5 MB
- Available in: 37 languages
- List of languages Albanian, Arabic, Armenian, Basque, Belarusian, Brazilian Portuguese, Bulgarian, Catalan, Chinese (Simplified), Chinese (Traditional), Croatian, Czech, Danish, Dutch, English, French, Galician, Georgian, Greek, Hungarian, Italian, Japanese, Korean, Lithuanian, Persian, Polish, Portuguese, Romanian, Russian, Slovak, Spanish, Swedish, Thai, Turkish, Ukrainian.
- License: Simplified BSD License
- Website: mediaarea.net/MediaInfo

MediaInfo is a cross-platform, free and open source program that displays technical information about media files, as well as tag information for many audio and video files. It is used in many programs such as XMedia Recode, MediaCoder, eMule, and K-Lite Codec Pack. It can be easily integrated into any program using a supplied MediaInfo.dll. MediaInfo supports popular video formats (e.g. Matroska, WebM, AVI, WMV, QuickTime, Real, DivX, XviD) as well as lesser known or emerging formats. In 2012 MediaInfo 0.7.57 was also distributed in the PortableApps format.

MediaInfo provides a command-line interface for displaying the provided information on all supported platforms. Additionally, a GUI for viewing the information on Microsoft Windows and macOS is provided.

== Technical information ==
MediaInfo reveals information such as:

- General: Title, author, director, album, track number, date, duration
- Video: codec, aspect ratio, framerate, bitrate
- Audio: codec, sample rate, channels, language, bitrate
- Text: subtitle language
- Chapters: numbers of chapters, list of chapters

MediaInfo 0.7.51 and newer retrieve codec information optionally from tags or by computation. Thus in the case of misleading tags erroneous codec information may be presented.

MediaInfo installer was previously bundled with "OpenCandy". However, you were able continue the installation process without installing it. This is no more the case since April 2016.

=== Supported input formats ===
MediaInfo supports just about any video and audio file including:

- Video: MXF, MKV, OGM, AVI, DivX, WMV, QuickTime, RealVideo, Mpeg-1, MPEG-2, MPEG-4, DVD-Video (VOB), DivX, XviD, MSMPEG4, ASP, H.264 (Mpeg-4 AVC)
- Audio: OGG, MP3, WAV, RealAudio, AC3, DTS, AAC, M4A, AU, AIFF, Opus
- Subtitles: SRT, SSA, ASS, SAMI

=== Supported operating systems ===
MediaInfo supports Microsoft Windows XP or later, macOS, Android, iOS (iPhone / iPad) Solaris and many Linux and BSD distributions. MediaInfo also provides source code so essentially any operating system or platform can be supported. An old version 0.7.60 for Windows 95 to 2000 exists.

There is a Doom9 thread for MediaInfo developers also covering simplified and modified implementations.

== Licensing ==
Up to version 0.7.62 the MediaInfo library was licensed under the GNU Lesser General Public License, while GUI and CLI were provided under the terms of the GNU General Public License. Starting with version 0.7.63 the project switched to a BSD 2-clause license ("Simplified BSD License").

== See also ==
- GSpot Codec Information Appliance
- FFmpeg command line tool ffprobe
- ExifTool
