= Microsoft Expression Encoder =

Transcoding and non-linear video editing software application

- Microsoft Expression Encoder 4 on Windows 7
- Developer(s): Microsoft
- Initial release: September 6, 2007; 17 years ago
- Final release: 4 SP2 (4.0.4276.0) / November 2, 2011; 13 years ago
- Operating system: Windows XP or later
- Platform: .NET Framework, DirectX, Silverlight, QuickTime and AviSynth
- Available in: English, French, German, Spanish, Italian, Japanese, Chinese Simplified, Chinese Traditional, and Korean
- Type: Transcoding and non-linear video editing
- License: Freemium
- Website: web.archive.org/web/20180205195252/https://www.microsoft.com/expression/eng/

Microsoft Expression Encoder (formerly Expression Media Encoder) is a discontinued transcoding and non-linear video editing software application for Microsoft Windows. It can create video streams for distribution via Microsoft Silverlight. This utility is created to record the screen for various purposes such as YouTube, Twitch etc.

== Overview ==
Expression Encoder is a transcoding and linear video editing program. It features a graphical user interface based on Windows Presentation Foundation (WPF) as well as a command line interface. It can export videos to H.264 or VC-1 formats or prepare video streams for distribution via Microsoft Silverlight. It supports Silverlight player controls and Silverlight templates.

Microsoft Expression Encoder is available in different editions:

1. Pro edition, the full-featured commercial incarnation of the product is available through retail or volume licensing outlets as well as the BizSpark program.
2. Pro edition without codecs, which lacks royalty-incurring codecs and is available to DreamSpark, WebsiteSpark, or MSDN subscribers. This version does not support H.264 or Advanced Audio Coding (AAC) formats in its output, nor can it open AVCHD, MPEG-2 and Dolby Digital (AC-3) formats.
3. Express edition is free of charge but feature limited. This version has the same restrictions as the Pro edition without codecs, but also does not support live streaming.

== History ==
Version 1.0 was released to manufacturing on September 6, 2007.

A beta of version 2.0 was released in March 2008 which included new VC-1 codecs (Advanced, Main, and Simple profiles) and better Silverlight support. Version 2 was released to manufacturing in May 2008. Expression The first service pack added H.264+AAC encoding support for devices. According to Microsoft, Expression Encoder 2 was not a replacement for Windows Media Encoder, despite having many similarities.

Expression Encoder 3 added multi-channel audio output, more built-in device profiles, like support for Zune HD, Xbox 360 and iPod Touch, as well as profiles for online services such as Facebook and YouTube. It also added Expression Encoder 3 Screen Capture, which allows users to create video screen captures.

Version 4 added IIS live smooth streaming, screen capture improvements and an H.264 encoder based on the MainConcept SDK. Expression Encoder 4.0 SP1 was released in January 2011 and added CUDA-enabled GPU-assisted encoding, HE-AAC, screen captures as a live source, live broadcasting templates, Selective Blend de-interlacing and other features. Service Pack 2 (SP2) with about 300 bugs fixes was released on November 2, 2011, and added new features such GPU-accelerated video encoding and the removal of 10 minutes screen recording limit.

== Features ==
Some Microsoft Expression Encoder components include:

- Smart encoding and smart recompression for WMV if the source is also WMV and no frame operations are performed, cuts editing, serial batch encoding, Live encoding from webcams and DV camcorders
- Decoding/import format support because of DirectShow
- Streaming (720p+ video using HTTP) with optimized client (Silverlight) and server (IIS with smooth streaming)
- Integrated WebDAV publishing.
- Publishing API.
- Importing XAML overlays created in Expression Design and customizing their timing, animation, opacity, placement and looping
- JavaScript trigger events
- Windows Media 11 SDK and VC-1 SDK integration, native MPEG-2 decoder
- Adding captions to videos using SAMI or W3C Timed Text format
- Previewing and comparing encoding settings in real time
- Screen capture
- Object model for the encoding engine

== System requirements ==
System requirements
Operating System	Windows XP with Service Pack 3 or later
Processor	1 GHz or higher
RAM	1 GB or more
Hard disk	2 GB free disk space or more
Display	1024×768 pixels screen or larger
Video card	128 MB video RAM; Support for DirectX 9 and Pixel Shader 3
Software	.NET Framework 4.0; Silverlight 4 or later QuickTime 7 or later (optional); AviSynth

== Limitations ==
Microsoft Expression Encoder cannot encode video streams in Windows Media Video formats older than version 9. Expression Encoder requires QuickTime to decode MP4 container format, although Media Foundation, a component of Windows 7, can natively decode this format.

== See also ==
- Comparison of screencasting software
