= Media Player Classic =

Media player for Microsoft Windows

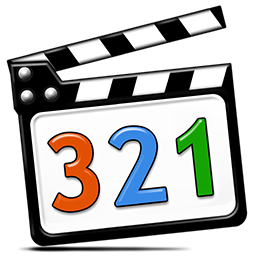

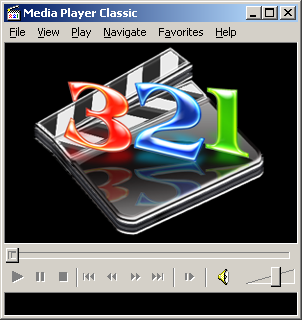
- Original author: Gabest
- Developer: MPC Community Forum
- Release: May 30, 2003; 23 years ago
- Final release: Original: 6.4.9.0 / March 20, 2006; 20 years ago
- Preview release: Fork by clsid - Last release: 6.4.9.1 Revision 107 / February 14, 2010; 16 years ago
- Written in: C++
- Operating system: Windows, ReactOS
- Size: Orig. 6.4.9.0: 2.2 MB (Zip); Fork 6.4.9.1: 2.1 MB (Zip)
- Available in: 11 languages
- List of languages English, Russian, Chinese (Simplified), Chinese (Traditional), Czech, French, German, Hungarian, Italian, Japanese, Ukrainian
- License: GPL-2.0-or-later
- Website: Original MPC on Doom9; MPC 6.4.9.1 on Doom9; MPC 2.0.0 on Doom9
- Repository: Original: https://sf.net/p/guliverkli/code/ Fork: https://sf.net/p/guliverkli2/code/

Media Player Classic (MPC) and its derivatives are a family of free and open-source media players for 32-bit and 64-bit versions of the Microsoft Windows operating system. Focusing on compactness and customizability, Media Player Classic mimics the simplistic look and feel of Windows Media Player 6.4, but provides most options and features available in modern media players. The original MPC stopped development in 2006 after which it was forked into two new projects: Media Player Classic - Home Cinema (MPC-HC) and Media Player Classic - Black Edition (MPC-BE), which are now principally maintained by the community at the Doom9 forum.

The active fork Media Player Classic - Home Cinema (MPC-HC) is maintained by "clsid2" (same developer known as clsid responsible for MPC 6.4.9.1), and Media Player Classic - Black Edition (MPC-BE) by "aleksoid". Variations of the original MPC and its forks are standard media players in the K-Lite Codec Pack and the Combined Community Codec Pack.

== Development ==
The original Media Player Classic was created and maintained by a programmer named "Gabest" who also created PCSX2 graphics plugin GSDX. It was developed as a closed-source application, but later relicensed as free software under the terms of the GPL-2.0-or-later license. MPC is hosted under the guliverkli project at SourceForge platform. The project itself is something of an umbrella organization for works by Gabest.

Media Player Classic development stalled in May 2006. Gabest, the main developer of the original version, stated in March 2007 that development of Media Player Classic is not dead but that he was unable to work on it. MPC 6.4.9.0, released March 20, 2006, is the final official version.

== Forks ==
=== Media Player Classic 6.4.9.1 ===
In August 2007, an unofficially patched and updated build became available from Doom9 member "clsid", hosted under the guliverkli2 project at SourceForge platform. Known as Media Player Classic 6.4.9.1, it was meant for fixing bugs and updating outdated libraries, but its development has been inactive since 2011. MPC 6.4.9.1 Revision 107, released February 14, 2010, is the final release version. The community at the Doom9 forum has since further continued the project with MPC-HC.

=== MPC Home Cinema ===
Media Player Classic - Home Cinema
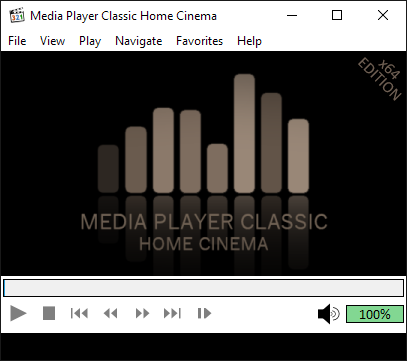
- Media Player Classic - Home Cinema version 2.5.3 on Windows 10
- Developer: MPC-HC Community Forum
- Release: September 2007; 19 years ago
- Stable release: 2.8.5 / November 6, 2026; 2 days ago
- Preview release: 2.8.4.86 / October 4, 2026; 35 days ago
- Written in: C, C++
- Size: Fork x64: 22.1 MB (Exe); Fork x86: 20.6 MB (Exe)
- Available in: 42 languages
- List of languages Arabic, Armenian, Basque, Belarusian, Bengali, Bosnian, Catalan, Chinese (Simplified), Chinese (Traditional), Croatian, Czech, Danish, Dutch, English, English (British), Finnish, French, Galician, German, Greek, Hebrew, Hungarian, Indonesian, Italian, Japanese, Korean, Lithuanian, Malay, Polish, Portuguese (Brazil), Punjabi, Romanian, Russian, Serbian, Slovak, Slovenian, Swedish, Spanish, Tatar, Thai, Turkish, Ukrainian, Vietnamese
- License: GPL-3.0-or-later
- Website: MPC-HC official website (inactive); MPC-HC on Doom9 (active fork by clsid)
- Repository: Original: https://github.com/mpc-hc/mpc-hc Fork by clsid2: https://github.com/clsid2/mpc-hc/

A fork, called Media Player Classic - Home Cinema (MPC-HC), adds new features, as well as bug fixes and library updates. It also updated the license to GPL-3.0-or-later.

MPC-HC updates the original player and adds many useful functionalities including the option to remove tearing, additional video decoders (in particular H.264, VC-1 and MPEG-2 with DirectX Video Acceleration support), Enhanced Video Renderer support, and multiple bug fixes. There is also a 64 bit-version of Media Player Classic - Home Cinema for the various Windows x64 platforms. MPC-HC requires at least Windows XP Service Pack 3.

As of version 1.4.2499.0, MPC-HC implemented color management support, an uncommon feature that nearly all video players on Microsoft Windows lack. Windows 8 support was introduced in version 1.6.5. Beginning with version 1.6.6 the stable releases are signed.

Apart from stable releases as published, nightly builds are also publicly available. MPC-HC is also distributed in the PortableApps format. MPC-HC 1.7.1 adds support for H.265/HEVC codec. MPC-HC 1.7.8 released in 2015 was built with the MediaInfoLib 0.7.71.

MPC-HC 1.7.13 is the final version of the program that was officially discontinued as of July 16, 2017 due to a shortage of active developers with C/C++ experience. Its source code on GitHub was last updated on August 27, 2017, a month and a half after the official final version. It requires CPUs with SSE2 support and no longer runs on Intel Pentium III or AMD Athlon XP.

==== MPC-HC fork by clsid2 ====
Updated builds of MPC-HC, a fork from the same developer (known as clsid2 on GitHub/SourceForge) responsible for MPC 6.4.9.1, started appearing in January 2018. This fork contains updated internal codecs (LAV Filters), AV1 support, youtube-dl integration, a new dark theme, video preview on seekbar, support for MPC Video Renderer, A-B Repeat, subtitle performance improvements; support for Windows XP was dropped in these builds. Binary releases are available, as well as source code.

=== MPC Black Edition ===
Media Player Classic - Black Edition
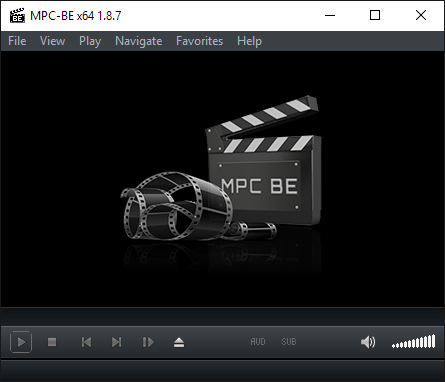
- A screenshot of MPC-BE v.1.8.7, on Windows 10.
- Developer: Alexander Vodiannikov
- Release: September 12, 2012; 14 years ago
- Stable release: 1.9.0 / June 27, 2026; 4 months ago
- Preview release: 1.5.6.5943 / January 10, 2021; 5 years ago
- Size: x86: 16.6 MB (Zip) x86-64: 18.1 MB (Zip)
- Available in: 25 languages
- List of languages Russian, Basque, Belarusian, Catalan, Chinese (Simplified), Chinese (Traditional), Czech, Dutch, English, French, German, Greek, Hebrew, Hungarian, Italian, Japanese, Korean, Polish, Portuguese (Brazil), Romanian, Slovak, Swedish, Spanish, Turkish, Ukrainian
- License: GPL-3.0-or-later
- Website: mpcbe.sourceforge.io
- Repository: https://sf.net/p/mpcbe/code/ https://github.com/Aleksoid1978/MPC-BE

Media Player Classic - Black Edition (MPC-BE) is a fork of MPC and MPC-HC. It moved away from MPC's aim to mimic the look and feel of Windows Media Player with updated player controls and provides additional features on top of MPC-HC such as a video preview tooltip when hovering the mouse cursor over the seek bar, as known from video platforms such as YouTube and Dailymotion, though many of these features, including the video preview on seekbar, were added to MPC-HC at a later date.

MPC-BE, however, doesn't include LAV filters by default, making it less efficient than MPC-HC for decoding. This is most noticeable with higher resolution files, newer codecs, or on lower end hardware.

Player development began in February 2011. Developers used a modification of MPC-HC made by a programmer nicknamed "bobdynlan". The first version (1.0.1.0) was released on September 12, 2012.

Starting with version 1.5.0, released in December 2016, MPC-BE no longer supports Windows XP. Support for Windows Vista ended at version 1.6.7, released May 2023. MPC-BE version 1.5.1 and newer require SSE2 supporting CPU and no longer run on Intel Pentium III or AMD Athlon XP.

Nightly builds are also available.

MPC-BE on SourceForge links to MPC-BE on GitHub.

== Media formats and features ==
Media Player Classic is capable of VCD, SVCD, and DVD playback without installation of additional software or codecs. MPC has built-in codecs for MPEG-2 video with support for subtitles and codecs for LPCM, MP2, 3GP, AC3, and DTS audio; along with native playback of the Matroska container format. MPC also contains an improved MPEG splitter that supports playback of VCDs and SVCDs using its VCD/SVCD/XCD Reader. On October 30, 2005, Gabest added MP4 and MPEG-4 Timed Text support. Adobe Flash movies (SWF) can be played and frames jumped to.

Supported media formats within the latest builds of MPC-HC and MPC-BE have been considerably expanded compared to the original MPC, as these builds are bundled with iterations of libavcodec and libavformat. MPC-HC version 1.7.0 and newer utilize LAV filters, while MPC-BE uses FFmpeg directly. Consequently, they support all formats from those libraries. MPC-HC is also one of the first media players to support Dolby Atmos audio natively.

MPC can use an INI file in its application folder, making it a portable application.

=== DirectShow ===
Media Player Classic is primarily based on the DirectShow architecture and therefore automatically uses installed DirectShow decoding filters. For instance, after the open source DirectShow decoding filter ffdshow has been installed, fast and high quality decoding and postprocessing of the MPEG-4 ASP, H.264, and Flash Video formats is available in the original MPC. MPC-HC and MPC-BE, however, can play videos in these formats directly without ffdshow.

MPC-HC and MPC-BE also provide DXVA support for compatible Intel, Nvidia, and ATI/AMD video cards when using a compatible codec. This provides hardware-acceleration for playback.

In addition to DirectShow, MPC can also use the QuickTime, RealPlayer, and SHOUTcast codecs and filters (if installed on the computer) to play their native files. Though some of these files may play without the external codecs or filters installed. Alternatively, QuickTime Alternative and Real Alternative can be used in place of their player installations for expanded support of their respective file formats.

=== TV tuners ===
MPC supports playback and recording of television if a supported TV tuner is installed.

== See also ==
- Comparison of video player software
- DirectVobSub
- WASAPI
- VLC media player
