= Telestream =

American software company

Telestream, Inc.
- Industry: Computer software
- Founded: 1998 in Nevada City, California, United States
- Headquarters: Nevada City, California, United States
- Area served: Worldwide
- Key people: Dan Castles, CEO; Benjamin Desbois; Anna Greco; Mark Wronski
- Products: Vantage; Wirecast
- Number of employees: 500
- Website: telestream.net

Telestream, Inc. is an American privately held computer software company.

== History ==
The company, founded in 1998, is headquartered in Nevada City, California with personnel in France, Germany, Sweden, Poland, Canada and the UK.

Telestream provides live and on-demand digital video tools and workflow solutions.

As of Q1 2010, revenues for enterprise products were up 25% for the first quarter over the previous year, and desktop products grew by 45%. More than 80% of broadcast station groups, media companies and Fortune 100 companies, along with consumers, currently use Telestream products.

In May 2022, it was announced Telestream had acquired the Aspen-based cloud media processing platform, Encoding.com.

== Awards ==
- On September 11, 2015, Telestream received an Emmy Award for Technology and Engineering.
