= VirtualDub =

Video capture software for Windows

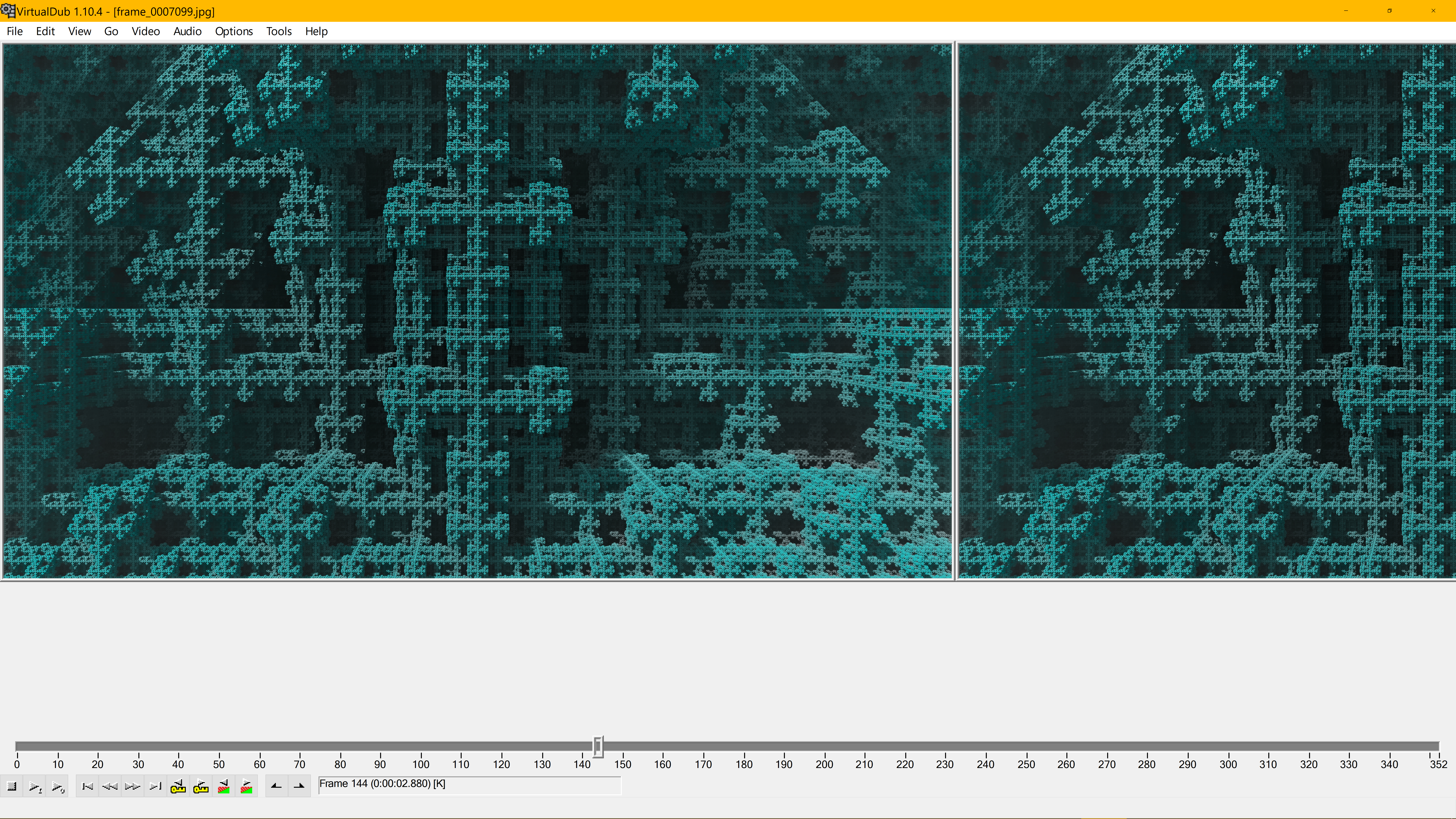
- Developer: Avery Lee
- Initial release: August 16, 2000; 25 years ago
- Final release: 1.10.4.35491 / 27 October 2013
- Written in: Assembly language, C++
- Operating system: Microsoft Windows
- Type: Video editing software
- License: GPL-2.0-or-later
- Website: www.virtualdub.org
- Repository: sourceforge.net/projects/virtualdub/files/

VirtualDub is a free and open-source video capture and video processing utility for Microsoft Windows written by Avery Lee. It is designed to process linear video streams, including filtering and recompression. It uses AVI container format to store captured video. The first version of VirtualDub, written for Windows 95, to be released on SourceForge was uploaded on August 20, 2000.

In 2009, the third-party software print guide Learning VirtualDub referred to VirtualDub as "the leading free Open Source video capture and processing tool". Due to its "powerful" versatility and usefulness especially in the field of video processing (see below), PC World has referred to VirtualDub as "something of a 'Photoshop' for video files", PC Perspective recommends it for its low overhead, and nextmedia's PC & Tech Authority particularly praises it for its Direct stream copy feature to avoid generational degradation of video quality when performing simple editing and trimming tasks and the fact that VirtualDub "offers several valuable features that other packages lack, and helps you get quick results without any fuss or patronising wizards".

VirtualDub is recommended for use by professional computer and tech magazines, guides, and reviewers such as PC World, PC & Tech Authority, PC Perspective, technologies guide website MakeTechEasier, freeware and open source software review site Ghacks, Speed Demos Archive, as well as third-party professional video production companies, and the creators of Wine.

Several hundred third-party plug-ins for VirtualDub exist, including by professional software companies. Furthermore, Debugmode Wax allows use of VirtualDub plug-ins in professional video editing software such as Adobe Premiere Pro and Vegas Pro.

== Features ==
VirtualDub is designed for Microsoft Windows but may run on Linux and Mac OS X using Wine (for example, to use it with the popular Deshaker plugin). However, native support for these systems is not available.

VirtualDub was made to operate exclusively on AVI files; however, a plugin API was added from version 1.7.2 which allows the import of other formats. Appropriate video and audio codecs need to be installed.

=== Video capture ===
VirtualDub supports both DirectShow and Video for Windows for video capture. Capture features include capture to any AVI variant, audio VU meters, overlay and preview modes, histogram, selectable crop area, video noise reduction, auto stop settings (based on capture time, file size, free space, and/or dropped frames), and designate alternate drive(s) for capture overflow.

VirtualDub can help overcome problems with digital cameras that also record video. Many models, especially Canon, record in an M-JPEG format incompatible with Sony Vegas 6.0 and 7.0. Saving AVI files as "old-style AVI" files allows them to appear in Vegas.

VirtualDub supports DV capture from Type 2 (VfW) FireWire controllers only (It cannot work with Type 1). There is no DV batch capture, still image capture, or DV device control capability.

=== Video assembly ===
VirtualDub can create a video file from a series of image files in Truevision TGA or Windows Bitmap file formats. Individual frames must be given file names numbered in sequential order without any gaps (e.g. 001.bmp, 002.bmp, 003.bmp..). From those, the frame rate can be adjusted, and other modifications such as the addition of a soundtrack can be made.

VirtualDub can also disassemble a video by extracting its soundtracks and saving its frames into Truevision TGA or Windows Bitmap files.

=== Editing ===
VirtualDub can delete segments of a video file, append new segments, or reorder existing segments. Appended segments must have similar audio and video formats, dimensions, number of audio channels, frame rates and sampling rates. Otherwise, VirtualDub is incapable of mixing dissimilar video files or adding transition effects between segments.

=== Video processing ===
VirtualDub comes with a number of video editing components known as "filters". They can perform basic tasks as arbitrary resize, converting the video to grayscale, arbitrary rotation, crop, or changing simple values like brightness and contrast. Filters may be used during the video assembly as well. Filter plug-ins further extend VirtualDub's capabilities. A plug-in SDK is available for developers to create their own video and audio filters.

Besides those basic features, third-party plug-ins are available to extend VirtualDub's feature set, including filters related to either aesthetic effects or cleaning, fixing, and restoring image quality, such as various denoising and sharpening methods targeted especially at analogue and digital video signal and film defects (be they related to VHS, faulty cables, a distorted analogue terrestrial or satellite TV reception, or digital compression), deinterlacing and fields manipulation, colorspace conversion and manipulation, reverse telecine aka IVTC, deflickering, deshaking, adding and removing logos and subtitles, analysis of video content, etc.

All of these processing features are fully batchable to apply the same effects on a large number of files.

== Development ==
VirtualDub is free software, released under the GNU GPL-2.0-or-later and hosted on SourceForge.net.

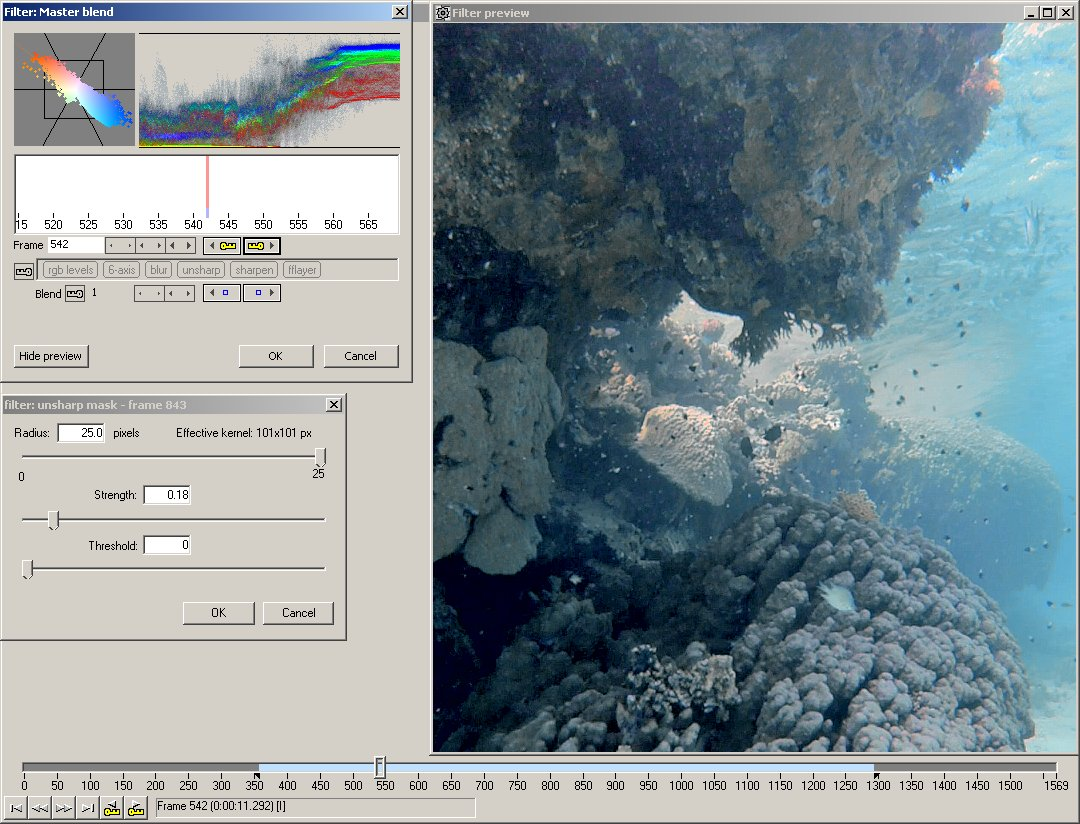
VirtualDub2 screenshot

VirtualDub was originally created by the author, then a college student, for the purpose of compressing anime videos of Sailor Moon. It was written to read and write AVI videos, but support for input plug-ins was added, enabling it to read additional formats including MPEG-2, Matroska, Flash Video, Windows Media, QuickTime, MP4 and others. Development stopped as of 2013 and the site's forums closed down in 2015.

VirtualDub has spawned several forks, including VirtualDubMod and Nandub.

=== VirtualDub2 ===
The latest fork is called VirtualDub2 (formerly VirtualDub FilterMod). It has all the features of the original VirtualDub, plus support for high bit-depth (i.e., deep color). It is no longer limited to Video for Windows (Video Compression Manager) codecs, and AVI format limitations (such as limited VBR support, H.264/HEVC minor incompatibilities etc.).

VirtualDub2 has built-in encode/decode of any container and video and audio compression formats supported by FFmpeg (H.264, HEVC, VP9, AAC, Opus and other formats) and can open and save QuickTime File Format (MOV), MP4, Matroska, WebM, AVI based on FFmpeg or only the audio from a video in M4A, Opus in Matroska, Ogg Opus, Vorbis, AAC or MP3 formats.

It also has improved navigation, display and user interface (e.g. pan display when zoomed in, color format selection), improved performance, and support for high bit-depth color formats.

=== Past legal issues ===
Early versions of VirtualDub supported importing of Microsoft's Advanced Systems Format, but this was removed in version 1.3d following an informal phone call from a Microsoft employee in 2000 claiming that it infringed one of Microsoft's patents. Microsoft never identified any specific patent numbers that it believed to have been infringed, but speculation by others is that US 6041345 (expired in 2017) might be relevant.

In August 2006, VirtualDub's German users who hosted copies of VirtualDub, or even linked to them on their web pages, began receiving cease and desist letters from a private individual that claimed to have German word mark on "VirtualDub". However this issue has been resolved: the word mark in Germany has been deleted and an injunction has been granted against the former owner of said word mark.

== See also ==
- List of video editing software
- Comparison of screencasting software
- Comparison of video editing software
- Avidemux
- AviSynth
- MediaCoder
