= Subtitle Edit =

Open-source video subtitle editor

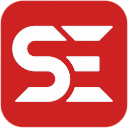

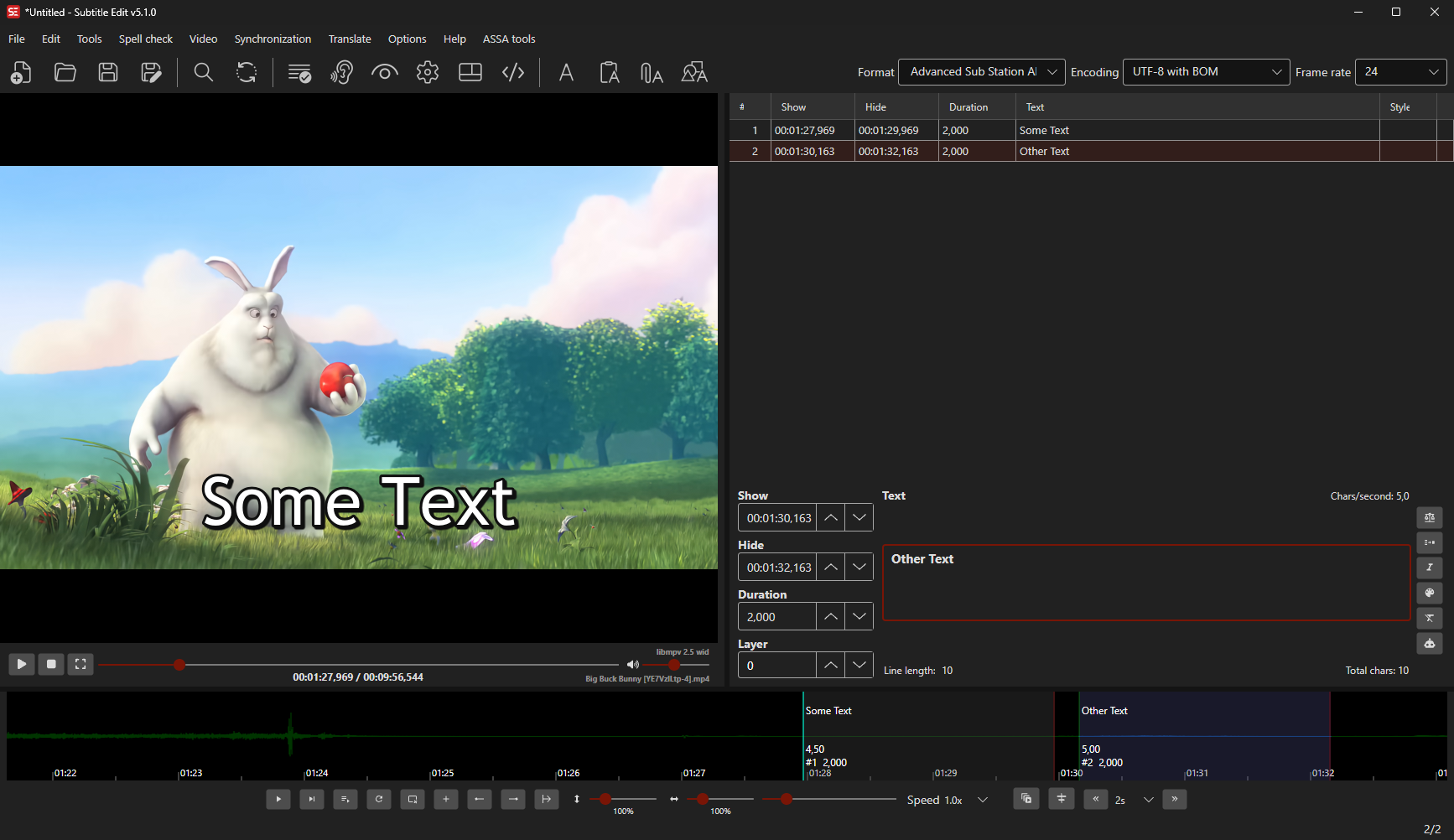
- Subtitle Edit in Dark Mode on Windows 11; Main window with wave form and video player
- Developer: Nikolaj Lynge Olsson
- Stable release: 5.2.0 / 10 September 2026; 17 days ago
- Preview release: N/A
- Written in: C# (2009 - Present); Borland Delphi (2001 - 2009)
- Operating system: Windows 10 v22H2 and later; macOS 12 and later; Linux
- Platform: x64 or ARM64; .NET 10.0 and Avalonia
- Size: 30.8 MB – 141 MB
- Available in: 34 languages
- List of languages English, Chinese, Argentina, Basque, Brazilian Portuguese, Bulgarian, Catalan, Chinese, Croatian, Czech, Danish, Dutch, Finnish, French, German, Greek, Hungarian, Italian, Macedonian, Norwegian, Persian, Japanese, Korean, Polish, Portuguese, Romanian, Russian, Serbian, Slovenian, Spanish, Swedish, Thai, Turkish, Ukrainian, Vietnamese
- Type: Subtitle editor
- License: MIT License
- Website: nikse.dk/subtitleedit/
- Repository: github.com/SubtitleEdit/subtitleedit

Subtitle Edit (also known as SE) is a free and open-source subtitle editor for Windows, macOS and Linux. It is used to create, edit, synchronize and convert video subtitles, and includes tools for automatic transcription, translation and conversion of image-based subtitles to text.

== Features ==
SE supports 250+ subtitle formats. Some of the most popular ones are SubRip, Timed Text, DFXP (Netflix standards), ITT (iTunes), SubStation Alpha, MicroDVD, SAMI, D-Cinema and BdSub.Support for these formats isn't complete, though. For instance, WebVTT is one of the supported formats, but none of its styling features are supported.

As of version 5.0, SE relies on either the VLC media player or mpv for video playback, and FFmpeg for waveform generation.

SE is available in 34 languages and works on Windows and Linux.

== Development ==
In 2001, Nikolaj Lynge Olsson had started the development of Subtitle Edit in Delphi which continued until April 2009. On 6 March 2009, 2.0 Beta 1 version (build 42401) was released.

Over time, more developers have contributed to SE's development, and it is still active. It is hosted at GitHub.

On 17 May 2011, the developer announced the testing version of SE 3.2 for Linux. It uses the same source code that was developed for Windows, to implement it on Linux using Mono Project.

On 17 October 2011, the developer announced the availability of stable version for Linux. The developer himself stated that it is working well on Ubuntu.

Version 5.0 was released on 22 June 2026 as a rewrite with native support for Windows, macOS and Linux. At launch, some specialized features from version 4 had not yet been ported. The new interface uses Avalonia in place of Windows Forms.

== See also ==
- Comparison of subtitle editors
