= Taghreedat =

Arabic crowdsourced digital content

Taghreedat (Arabic: مبادرة تغريدات) is the largest Arabic crowdsourcing initiative in the MENA region. With a community of over 9,000 Arab translators, editors and writers residing in 35 countries around the world, of which are 20 Arab countries, Taghreedat aims to build an active Arabic digital content creation community that contributes directly and significantly to increasing the quality and quantity of Arabic content on the web, through crowdsourcing to increase Arab users' contribution to enriching Arabic content on the web through original content projects, and projects geared towards localization and Arabization.

Starting on May 31, 2011, on Twitter, as a call to action to increase the quality and quantity of Arabic digital content on Twitter via the hashtag #letstweetinarabic, Taghreedat has created a community of Arabic digital content enthusiasts from all parts of the Arab world, through its verified account on Twitter: @Taghreedat, which has over 142,000 followers.

Taghreedat has collaborated with a number of international and regional stakeholders, among which are San Francisco-based organizations and companies including: Twitter, the Wikimedia Foundation, Storify, Easy Chirp, Meedan, Khan Academy, Google, WhatsApp, Coursera and Amara in addition to New York-based TED, Smartling and Foursquare in addition to Europe-based GameLoft and Abu Dhabi based twofour54 – the supporting organization which currently funds this initiative.

== Recognition and impact ==
- On October 4, 2012, The Dubai School of Government released its latest report, including a case study on Taghreedat as a model for social entrepreneurship in the Arab region, citing Taghreedat's impact on applying crowdsourcing to increase the quality and quantity of Arabic digital content. The report was released by The Governance and Innovation Program (GIP) at the Dubai School of Government, in partnership with SAP MENA, and included a regional eight country survey to measure perceptions on the impact of social media usage on economic empowerment, employment and entrepreneurship in Bahrain, Egypt, Jordan, Kuwait, Lebanon, Oman, Saudi Arabia and the UAE.
- On August 29, 2012, Taghreedat was selected as one of the Middle East's Top 25 Tech Initiatives leading the technology innovation scene in the Middle East region, in a list that has been created by The Wall Street Journal's Neil Parmar and published in Washington, D.C.-based Al Monitor. Taghreedat was ranked 12th in the list, making it the only nonprofit initiative to have been included in the list, which also highlighted included various startups as part of its rankings.
- Previously, on March 9, 2012, during the Presidential Official Statements at the ITU's Connect Arab States Summit held in Doha, Qatar, the Egyptian Presidential Statement, delivered by Egypt's Minister of Telecommunications singled out Taghreedat has one of the region's strongest efforts to enrich Arabic digital content.
- In a recent Klout study, dated April 2012, Taghreedat's Twitter account rounded in the top 5 most influential non-personal Arab Twitter accounts, in terms of reach, volume of interactions, retweets, mentions and overall user network.
- Taghreedat's projects have been covered in a number of international and regional media outlets, including: CNN, The Next Web, The Wall Street Journal, BBC World, France 24, CNBC ArabiYa, Al Jazeera, Al Arabiya, Sky News Arabia, Chicago Tribune, Khaleej Times, Screen Daily, The Hollywood Reporter, Variety, Arabian Business, The National, Al Youm Al Sabe' and others.
- Taghreedat has also participated in a number of international and regional events to showcase its community-driven projects including Wikimania 2012 in Washington, D.C., and TEDGlobal in Idinbrugh, United Kingdom. The initiative also participated in the Abu Dhabi Media Summit, where it held and spoke at a panel discussion on crowdsourcing with three of its key international stakeholders: Twitter, Storify and Meedan. Taghreedat also participated at the ITU Telecom World 2012, which was held in Dubai, UAE. The initiative spoke at a panel discussion on Big Data and how crowdsourcing fits into the ever-increasing debate on data ownership.

== Partnerships and collaborations ==
Taghreedat has collaborated with the following international digital content companies and organizations:

- Google, globally
- Twitter, Inc. in San Francisco, California
- TED in New York City
- Wikimedia Foundation in San Francisco
- Storify in San Francisco
- Meedan in San Francisco
- Khan Academy in California
- WhatsApp in California
- GameLoft in Europe
- Easy Chirp in California
- Coursera in California
- Smartling in New York
- Amara in New York
- Foursquare in New York

== Taghreedat's projects ==
=== Twitter Arabization Project ===
The first of Taghreedat's projects which commenced on October 22, 2011, Taghreedat gathered a group of volunteers to Arabize over 190 Twitter glossary terms from English to Arabic to be then applied on Twitter's Arabic interface. Taghreedat collaborated with Twitter to develop such glossary, through a campaign that the initiative launched under the hashtag #letstweetinarabic to create momentum and awareness and was considered by Twitter as a grassroots step in the eventual launch of Twitter's Arabic interface, which Taghreedat and thousands of Arab volunteers at Twitter's Translation Center have contributed to make it a reality.

=== Arabic Wikipedia Editors Program ===
In cooperation of the Wikimedia Foundation, Taghreedat has launched the Arabic Wikipedia Editors Program – a regional program which targets regular Internet users to train them (both online & offline) become Arabic Wikipedia editors. The program is composed of two main components: online training as well as offline workshops (training component) in addition to a reward component in the form of official certificates that the volunteer participants will be receiving. The project was launched in mid June 2012 and continues to attract new Arabic Wikipedia editors.

=== Storify Arabization Project ===
In mid May 2012, Taghreedat announced that it has started working with San Francisco-based Storify, the online curation social platform, to Arabize its website interface. Crowd-sourced community work on the project continued for 3 weeks until June 7, 2012. Starting July, Taghreedat has started working with Storify on the back-end to ensure the Arabic Storify interface is implemented while taking Arabic text placement in consideration. When launched, Arabic will become among the first 3 languages to be applied to the online curation website interface.

=== First Arabic Tech/Web 2.0 Dictionary ===
Taghreedat is developing the first crowd-sourced Arabic technology dictionary for technology and social media terms, translated from English to Arabic. The dictionary comprises over 6,500 technology terms in various fields, including: cyber safety, cyber security, graphic design, PC terminology and more. Started in mid June 2012, work is currently ongoing to gather the Taghreedat community votes on all 6500 terms. The dictionary, expected to be launched later this year, has attracted the attention of a number of US and UK media outlets, tipping it as the first crowd-sourced collection of Arabic technology terms in the MENA region.

=== TED Website Localization Project ===
On September 4, 2012, Taghreedat announced that it has begun working with the TED headquarters in New York to localize its official website into Arabic for the first time. The project will be carried out by Taghreedat's volunteer base, applying the same crowdsourcing model that Taghreedat has applied in its previous localization projects with Twitter and Storify.

=== Memorandum of Understanding with Meedan ===
At its panel discussion session with a number of its international stakeholders including Twitter, Storify and Meedan, Taghreedat announced the signing of a Memorandum of Understanding (MoU) with Meedan, the California based social translation and software NGO. This collaboration focuses on translating Open Education Resources (OER), and hence increasing the availability of educational resources in Arabic language for users worldwide, particularly students. The partnership will promote Taghreedat and Meedan's common goal of providing access to high quality Arabic digital educational content, Open Educational Resources, through online social translation software in the Middle East. This new agreement will allow Meedan, which has been working on building an online translation community since 2008, to focus its resources on program and software design and delivery. Taghreedat will work towards translating all online educational content and dialogue initiatives into Arabic through its active social media community of over 2500 volunteers.

=== Khan Academy Video Subtitling Project ===
On November 6, 2012, Khan Academy launched an effort with Taghreedat to localize its educational video library into Arabic, offering an opportunity for all Arabic speaking learners worldwide to access a vast amount of quality open educational resources in their native language for free. The project came as the first tangible outcome of Taghreedat's MoU with California-based Meedan, which was signed in October at the Abu Dhabi Media Summit. The partnership directly falls into Arabizing Open Educational Resources and marks the beginning of a larger call to action to channel Arab users' enthusiasm to enrich Arabic content online into more areas than interface localization.

=== Arabic Web Days Program ===
On November 23, 2012, Google announced the launch of "Arabic Web Days" to enrich digital Arabic content, through a series of activities and initiatives to be implemented by a group of prominent international bodies and regional shows in Middle East and North Africa over a month.

Google has partnered with Vinelab, Taghreedat and Wamda to shape the program, which also saw involvement of Twitter, WikiPedia, TED, SoundCloud and YouTube. The program was supported by local expertise from the Media Zone Authority in Abu Dhabi, twofour54 and Qatar Research Institute for Computing (QCRI).

=== Tajseed: the MENA Region's First Infographics Competition ===
As part of Arabic web days, Taghreedat has announced on November 26, 2012, that it has partnered with Tajseed, the MENA region's first Arabic infographics competition, to launch the competition in its second round with the goal of amplifying the competition's goal and discovering Arab talent in the infographics field. Tajseed's first round had attracted over 40,000 visits to the website: tajseed.net and over 10,000 views to the competition video when it was first launched. By the end of the first round, over 300 Arabic infographics submissions were received and the winners were all announced in May 2012.

=== WikiQuote Project ===
In cooperation with the Wikimedia Foundation, Taghreedat is contributing to Wikimedia's WikiQuote project, a Wikipedia sister project that collects various popular quotes and cultural sayings from around the world. Taghreedat will be contributing with around 2,000 Arabic quotes – originating from the Arab world or translated into Arabic to enrich the Repository. The project started in May 2012 and will continue throughout the year.

=== WhatsApp Localization Project ===
On January 13, 2013, Taghreedat launched a collaboration with WhatsApp to improve the localization of its applicants on various mobile devices. The project attracted over 2,600 Arab volunteers who joined the WhatsApp Translation Center to suggest variations and add votes to the Arabic strings localized at the Translation Center. The project was followed by a collaboration between Taghreedat and WhatsApp to carry out the translation and localization of WhatsApp on Windows Phone 8.

=== GameLoft Website Localization Project ===
On February 26, 2013, Taghreedat announced its latest localization partnership with Gameloft, one of the top global gaming companies and producer of global gaming brands including Batman, Spider-Man, Ice Age, Rayman, Asphalt among others. The project was to localize over 250 strings of which the Gameloft website was comprised. The project marked the first time a global gaming company agrees to localize its website into Arabic to cater to Arabic speaking users particularly in the Middle East. Over 1,000 volunteers joined the project.

=== Wikimedia Commons Project ===
On April 6, 2013, Taghreedat announced its latest partnership with the Wikimedia Foundation to increase awareness, build interest and foster participation among Arabic social media users in Wikimedia Commons. Users were encouraged to register Wikipedia usernames and then upload their own work on Commons. More than 1800 volunteers signed up for the project.

=== Easy Chirp Localization Project ===
On May 1, 2013, Taghreedat launched a collaboration with Easy Chirp, the accessible Twitter application for the blind and visually impaired. The project entailed localizing all 400 strings of the application to be then delivered to Easy Chirp prior to the launch of the application in Arabic language for the first time. In 10 days, over 1800 Arab volunteers signed up to participate in the project. All strings were completed within 24 hours after the project launch.

=== Coursera and Taghreedat: Arabic OER Partnership ===
On May 19, 2013, Taghreedat announced a partnership with Coursera, the world's leading Massive Open Online Course (MOOC) provider to translate major international university courses across multiple disciplines for all Arab students around the world, for free. Top global universities including Stanford, Yale, Columbia, Georgia, Duke, Northwestern, Pennsylvania, Princeton, Edinburgh and many others are offering a number of their courses for free on Coursera in English language. With this partnership, some of the world's top university courses will finally be accessible for free for all Arabic speaking users. Taghreedat's 9,000 translators, writers and editors in 37 countries worldwide started to be involved in translating two university courses marking the official kick off of the collaboration with Coursera. Stanford University's Math Think Course and Duke University's Behavioral Economics will be the first two courses to be localized – with plans for more courses to follow. A group of Taghreedat translation language moderators will be managing the project quality throughout the following weeks to ensure the courses are localized accurately and are accent-free.

=== Amara.org Partnership ===
On August 30, 2013, Taghreedat announced a partnership with leading subtitling and captioning provider, Amara.org. Working with thousands of Arabic translators in the Taghreedat community, Amara and Taghreedat will be providing quality crowd-sourced Arabic subtitles to a wide range of organizations, businesses and projects worldwide. Amara will be involving top Taghreedat subtitlers and reviewers in major subtitling projects with some of the leading video producing organizations around the globe. Taghreedat will also carry out major Arabic subtitling projects on the platform, furthering its mission and commitment to increase Arabic digital content on the web.

== Sources ==
- Taghreedat Website
- Taghreedat on Twitter
- Al Arabiya News: Taghreedat To Offer Arab Tweeps Their Own Search Engine
- Top 25 Tech Stars in the Middle East Region - Al Monitor Original, By Neil Parmar
- Video from the Wikimedia Foundation on the Taghreedat/Wikipedia Partnership
- Wall Street Journal – Volunteers Compile Arabic e-Dictionary
- The Next Web – Taghreedat Launches Arabic Wikipedia Editors Program
- The Next Web: Middle East Volunteers Compile Web 2.0 Dictionary
- Wikimedia Foundation Blog: Who Will Lead Arabic Language Initiative?
- twofour54 supports Taghreedat to Increase Arabic Digital Content
- Twitter Blog: Twitter Now Available in Arabic, Farsi, Hebrew and Urdu
- BBC International – Push for Arabic Content [Video]
- The Next Web – Storify Working with Middle Eastern Initiative Taghreedat To Translate Storify Into Arabic
- The Next Web: Volunteer Translators Flock to Crowdsource The First Arabic Tech and Social Media Dictionary
- Variety Arabia: Taghreedat partners with Wikimedia Foundation
- The National: Coming to the web: Twitter in Arabic
- The National: Archiving website Storify to get Arabic translation thanks to Gulf volunteers
- Dubai School of Government 2012 Report: Taghreedat Case Study (p. 39)
- Khan Academy's Blog Post Announcement of its Taghreedat Collaboration
