= Gnome Subtitles =

Open-source subtitle editor

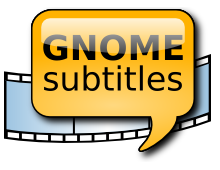

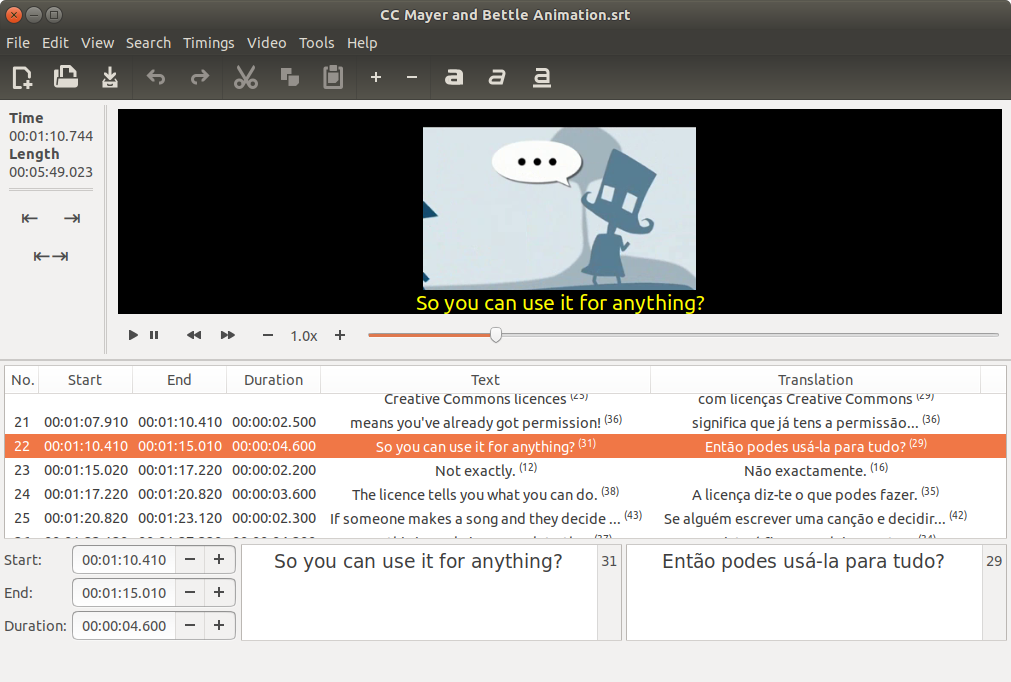
- Gnome Subtitles 1.4.1
- Developer: Pedro Castro
- Initial release: 1 September 2006
- Stable release: 1.8 / 24 June 2022; 3 years ago
- Repository: gitlab.gnome.org/GNOME/gnome-subtitles
- Written in: C# (Gtk#)
- Operating system: Linux
- Available in: Multilingual
- Type: Subtitling
- License: GPL
- Website: gnomesubtitles.org

Gnome Subtitles is an open-source subtitle editor for the GNOME desktop, based on Mono. It supports the most common text-based subtitle formats, video previewing, timings synchronization and subtitle translation.

Gnome Subtitles is free software released under the GNU General Public License.

== Features ==
Gnome Subtitles supports popular subtitle formats, such as SubStation Alpha (and also Advanced SubStation Alpha), SubRip and MicroDVD.

It has a WYSIWYG user interface, supporting emphasis (bold, italic and underline styles) and multi-level undo/redo. Gnome subtitles can also perform timing operations, edit subtitle headers and deal with subtitle's encoding automatically.

Video previewing, time shifts, encoding selection and subtitle merge/split have been added in the newer versions.

Similar programs are Aegisub, Jubler, Subtitle Editor, Gaupol, etc.

== See also ==
- Subtitle editor
- Comparison of subtitle editors
