= Subtitle editor =

Type of software

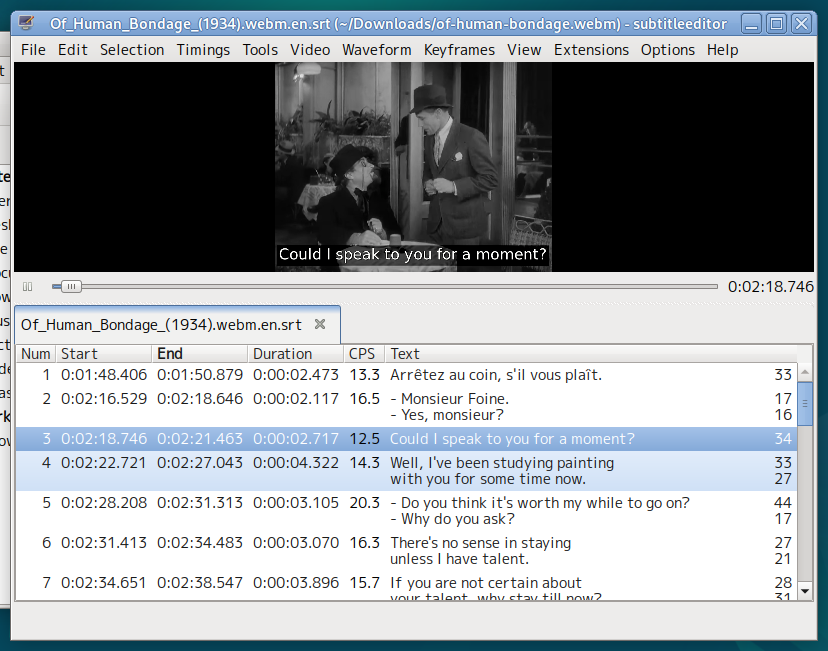
A screenshot of a subtitle editor showing a film scene

A subtitle editor is a type of software used to create and edit subtitles to be superimposed over, and synchronized with, a film or theatrical presentation. Such editors usually provide video preview, easy entering/editing of text, start, and end times, and control over text formatting and positioning. Subtitle editors are available as standalone applications, as components of many video editing software suites, and as web applications.

== Purpose ==
In television, subtitles are used for "clarification, translation, services for the deaf, as well as identifying places or people in the news." In movies, subtitles are mainly used for translations from foreign languages. Subtitles are frequently used to provide informative details regarding the action on screen, such as the names and titles of interview subjects, a discussion topic change, to spell out web URLs or email addresses, to assist understanding speakers who mumble, details in instructional videos such as recipe ingredients, and humorous effects such as commentary or contradictory captions.

Each subtitle, during editing, consists of text, a start time, an end time or duration, and optional text styling and positioning.

Time is measured either in video frames, in milliseconds, or in hours:minutes:seconds.frames/milliseconds. The exact format and separator characters (colon, period, comma, etc.) are determined by the subtitle format chosen. A capable subtitle editor can convert one time measurement system into another without error.

== Editor features ==
A subtitle editing tool will typically have these features:

- Capable of displaying a variety of video formats, loading and saving a wide variety of subtitle file formats
- Video preview: simultaneous, synchronized playback of video and subtitles, with pause/play and fine adjustment over video: jog/shuttling/slow-motion
- Text entry and editing
  - Search and replace of text to correct names, etc.
  - Spell check
  - Change text encoding for UTC−8, Unicode, etc.
- Change the duration of a given subtitle's display
- Shift subtitles or a block of subtitles back and forth in time
- Change subtitle format (MicroDVD, MPSub, SubRip, ...)
- Changing the time base frame rate 24, 25, 29.97, 30, etc.

Editors used by broadcasters may have additional features:

- Speech to text functionality, either for creation of offline subtitles, or for live respeaking
- Manual cue - allowing the user to manually 'play out' a subtitles to a range of output devices
- Live subtitling - where subtitles are created in real time for a live programme, usually via some fast typing method (e.g. steno, shortforms, or respeaking), and the subtitles are fed to external systems for transmission with the programme.

See the general description of subtitles for further description.

Not all editors are equally flexible in terms of video formats, subtitle formats, or ease of use.

== Examples of subtitle editors ==
- Aegisub - Free. Linux, OS X, Windows.
- Amara - Free.
- Gnome Subtitles - Free.
- Subtitle Edit - Free and Open Source under GPL License.
- Subtitle Composer - Free, open source, part of KDE.

== Related software ==
- SubRip - Free. Not an editor, but used to extract subtitles from VOB or hard subbed video files by optical character recognition to a subtitle file.
- Avidemux - Free. Avidemux is video editing software that can be used to extract subtitles like SubRip.
- VobSub/VSFilter/DirectVobSub - not an editor, but a Windows add-on (DirectX filter) which displays subtitles during video playback.

== See also ==
- Comparison of subtitle editors
