= Comparison of subtitle editors =

The following table compares some characteristics of notable subtitle editing software.

Name	License	Platform	Multilanguage	Audio waveform	Formats supported	Extra information
Aegisub	GPL (but code is ISC or BSD3c)	Cross platform	Yes	Yes	SSA/ASS, MicroDVD, .srt (full support); AdobeEncore, EBU STL (write only) JACOsub (read only)	Limited support for RTL languages. It's mainly used for creating ASS subtitles. Uses libass, making the ASS effects appear correctly in the internal media player.
Amara	Proprietary, formerly GNU AGPL	Web-based	Yes	?	SRT, SSA, SBV, VTT, DFXP, ITT, SCC and CAP formats.	Cloud platform with subtitle editor and workflow tools for collaborative captioning and subtitling, including making corrections to machine-generated captions. Add-ons include automatic speech recognition.
Subtitle Composer	GPL	Linux, Windows	Yes	Yes	WebVTT, SubRip/SRT, MicroDVD, SSA/ASS, MPlayer, TMPlayer, YouTube, VobSub, Blu-ray/PGS, DVD/Vob, DVB, XSUB, HDMV-PGS	Speech Recognition, Video preview, Translations, Subtitle positioning, JavaScript macros
Gnome Subtitles	GPL	Linux	Yes		Adobe Encore DVD, Advanced Sub Station Alpha, AQ Title, DKS Subtitle Format, FAB Subtitler, Karaoke Lyrics LRC, Karaoke Lyrics VKT, MacSUB, MicroDVD, MPlayer, MPlayer 2, MPSub, Panimator, Phoenix Japanimation Society, Power DivX, Sofni, SubCreator 1.x, SubRip, Sub Station Alpha, SubViewer 1.0, SubViewer 2.0	Built-in video preview, times synchronization, translation, spellcheck.
Subtitle Edit	GPL	Windows, OSX, Linux	Yes	Yes	250+	Translate mode, spell check, OCR, batch convert, uses .NET Framework

== See also ==
- Subtitle (captioning)
