= TTML =

TTML may refer to:

- Timed Text Markup Language
- Tagged Text Markup Language by Nokia; see Wireless Markup Language
