= VTT (disambiguation) =

VTT Technical Research Centre of Finland is a state-owned and controlled non-profit limited liability company in Otaniemi, Finland.

VTT may also refer to:

- Vacuum Tower Telescope, on Tenerife in the Canary Islands
- Vancouver Talmud Torah, a school in Vancouver, British Columbia
- Virtual tabletop, for boardgames and role-playing games
- WebVTT, timed text file format
- .vtt, file format for WebVTT
- Panhard M3 VTT (French: Véhicule de Transport de Troupes), an amphibious armoured personnel carrier
- the French term for a mountain bike, as in Championnat d'Afrique de VTT
- Voice-to-text software
