= Plumi =

Video sharing content management system

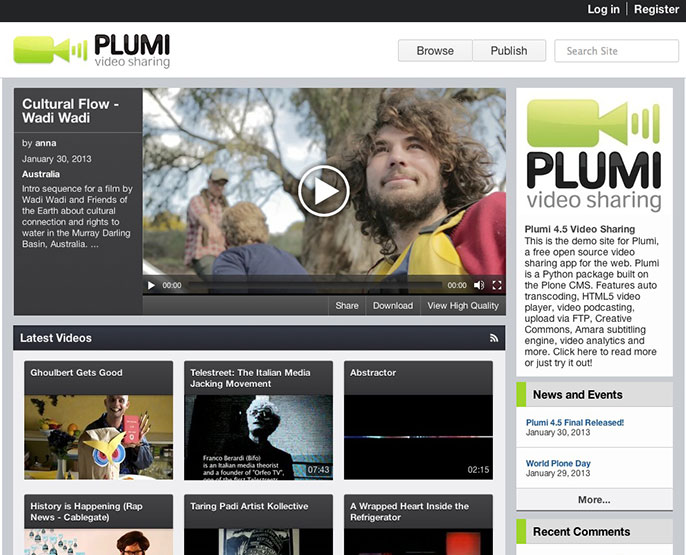
- Screenshot of Plumi Demo Site
- Developer: EngageMedia/Unweb
- Release: October 2006
- Stable release: 4.5 / January 31, 2013
- Written in: Python
- Operating system: Linux/Unix/Mac OS X
- License: GNU GPL/ZPL
- Website: engagemedia.org/projects/plumi/

Plumi was a free software video-sharing content management system (CMS) based on Plone, an open-source CMS. Plumi enables users to establish video-sharing websites.

Plumi is a free and open source alternative to YouTube. It was designed to allow communities to create video-sharing communities. and to be more accessible to non-profit groups and independent journalists.

== History ==
=== Plumi for Plone 2 ===
Plumi was first developed for Plone 2 by EngageMedia, with the first stable version released in September 2007, produced by EngageMedia and developed primarily by Andy Nicholson of Infinite Recursion and Dave Fregon of NetAxxs.

The second major release occurred on February 8, 2008. By this time the software was already in use by popular organizations including the World Social Forum TV, Bonn University Africa on TV, and CabTube.

=== Plumi for Plone 3 ===
Version 3.0 of Plumi is based on Plone 3 and was deployed on May 19, 2010. The latest production version is 3.1.2 which was released at the end of November 2010.

=== Plumi for Plone 4 ===
Development on migration to Plone 4 began in October 2010, with a 4.0b1 beta released in late November and a release candidate for 4.0 released in early December.

A final stable release of Plumi 4.0 for Plone 4.0 was released on January 17, 2011. This version includes bug fixes and improvements to ensure a stable release primarily focused on rebasing Plumi on Plone 4, in addition to other improvements and re-factoring of Plumi including new production and development build-outs located inside the plumi.app egg, updating the caching system, cleanup of installation code, and moving parts to GenericSetup, replacing older products with newer and better-maintained products, or removing dependencies and other improvements. FFmpeg and codecs required by the transcoding framework are also now included in the buildout which means a simpler installation process.

A beta of Plumi 4.3 was released on December 4, 2011. The beta includes updating to Plone 4.1.2, support for 16:9 video transcoding, WebM transcoding, replacement of Flowplayer with mediaelement.js HTML5 player, video language added to metadata and support for the Amara platform. A final version of 4.3 was released in January 2012.

Plumi 4.3.1 Final was released in April 2012. This includes minor improvements to the backend and user interface.

Plumi 4.5 Final was released in January 2013. The Plumi 4.5-final is a big stable production-ready release, including big improvements in both the user-interface and the back-end. Major changes in 4.5 centered around the creation of a new Plumi skin using Diazo, replacing Gunicorn with uWSGI, implementation of Amara subtitling engine and a video upload progress bar. Other improvements included removing views/downloads from the iframe for embedding, update to latest mediaelement.js and fixing of fullscreen playback. 4.5-final includes some changes after the beta include numerous improvements to the new Plumi skin, re-ordered user menu, removal of callouts folder and improved video upload stability.

== Features ==
Plumi enables the community to create their own video-sharing site. It includes an adaptive skin using Diazo, server-side transcoding of most video formats, upload progress bar, thumbnail extraction, HTML5 video playback and embedding, subtitles using Amara, large file uploading via FTP, social media integration, threaded commenting and user feedback forms, customized user profiles and a range of other features.

The latest version of Plumi is packaged with Plone 4.x. Developers have the option to run a buildout to create either a development or production environment using Plumi.
