= Imitext =

Bitmap subtitle transmission technique

Imitext is a bitmap subtitle transmission technique proprietary to Screen Subtitling Systems. The technology has been licensed to Scientific Atlanta for incorporation into their PowerVu encoders and decoders.

"PowerVu Video Subtitling" (PDF).
