= Airscript =

AirScript is a hand-held device that provides theatregoers with subtitles in a variety of languages. It was designed by Show Translations, a company that specializes in live entertainment translation, and built by Cambridge Consultants, a leading technology and product development firm.

The device was launched in November 2009 at the musical Hairspray at London’s Shaftesbury Theatre, where it received positive feedback from the audience and the press. Since then, it has been used in several other West End shows, such as Les Misérables, The Phantom of the Opera, and Wicked.

The AirScript device offers subtitles in eight languages: English, Chinese, French, German, Italian, Spanish, Russian, and Japanese. The subtitles are synchronized with the audio and displayed on a small screen that can be adjusted for brightness and contrast. The device also has a headphone jack for users who prefer to listen to the translation.

The AirScript device was created to attract more tourists to theatres who may not understand the language of the play. It was also intended to benefit Deaf and hearing-impaired patrons who can use the device to read English subtitles. The creators of AirScript had a vision of making theatre more accessible and inclusive for everyone, regardless of their linguistic or hearing abilities.
