= Interactive transcripts =

Interactive transcripts are a new tool for media consumption. Similar to subtitles in many ways, an interactive transcript is displayed beside the audio or video source. As the user hears the words being spoken, the matching words in the transcript are underlined or highlighted. Interactive transcripts allows users to interact with video in an entirely new way. Users can search the transcript of the video and navigate to an exact point by clicking on any word. Doing so greatly increases the retention of the material.

== Types ==
There are two broad categories of interactive transcripts. The first, characterized by YouTube, has timings (in minutes and seconds) running down the left side of the transcript. Users click on a block of words to jump to the corresponding section in the video. The second, characterized by Ted Talks, has the transcript in a paragraph form. This allows readers to read more naturally, and jump to a specific points in the video by clicking on a word in the text.

== Benefits ==
It has been reported that almost 1 in 20 Americans are deaf or hard-of-hearing, as well as millions more around the world. Whether at work or school or home, individuals that have difficulty hearing need new ways to understand and retain the material presented.

We read nearly twice as fast as we listen, assuming we want to read every word (an author's dream but not necessarily reality).

The average American adult reads prose at 275 to 350 words per minute while most of us speak at around 150-165 wpm. Slide presentations and speeches are often at 100–120 words per minute. Auctioneers speak at 200-250 wpm.

== Monetization ==
Many sites have various forms of audio/video on their website—these same sites rely on search engines for a substantial portion of their visitors. However, search engines currently don't have the capability to know what is in a picture, movie or audio file as they are all text-based. Therefore, these websites may have valuable content that search engines won't be able to know about.

The easiest solution to this problem is for website owners with media to include transcripts on their pages. This text must be placed in the HTML of the page and not loaded dynamically via JavaScript. Search engines will then be able to crawl the content and include it in their search results. This will lead to more visitors finding the relevant content they are looking for.

If the website owner utilizes advertising on their website, a corollary benefit of having a transcript accompany their media is that advertising platforms, such as Google AdWords, will be able to place relevant advertisements since the content of the media is now known.
