= Easy Chirp =

Assistive technology for Twitter

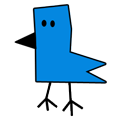
- Website type: Social media
- Available in: English, Spanish, French, German, Arabic
- Website: www.easychirp.com
- Current status: not supported

Easy Chirp is a third-party web-based Twitter interface built by Dennis Lembree. It is a web-accessible application, meaning that it is optimized for disabled users and users of assistive technology. Easy Chirp is also useful for those with lower-end technologies such as Internet Explorer 9, low-band Internet connection, and lack of JavaScript support. The simple interface is ideal for older users and those new to the web and social media, including Twitter. The website first appeared in early 2009, originally named Accessible Twitter, and was renamed to Easy Chirp in June 2011. In mid 2013, the website was down due for about five months due to a major engineering overhaul. The website was created by an individual web developer who also maintains a blog about web accessibility called Web Axe.

One of the innovations of Easy Chirp is the ability to tweet a link to an image with alternative text—both short and long descriptions. It was the first Twitter application (as well as the first social media application) to provide alternative text for an image. Although improved now, lack of alternative text for images was an accessibility problem on Twitter and social media in general.

Easy Chirp received the 2014 FCC Chairman's Award for Advancement in Accessibility, the 2010 AFB Access Award and the 2009 Access IT @web2.0 Award. The website was nominated for "Best API Use" in .net magazine's 2010 Best of the Web awards and nominated in the 2009 and 2010 Blind Bargains Access Awards. Easy Chirp was also the RNIB featured website for December 2011.

Due to major Twitter API changes in 2018, the direct messaging portion in Easy Chirp has extremely limited functionality.

In 2020, Easy Chirp announced via a tweet that it was no longer being maintained. At the same time, the Easy Chirp code base was made public on GitHub.

In July 2023, Easy Chirp became unavailable to due Elon Musk taking over Twitter and removing free access to the API.
