= Smartling =

American translation company

- Type: Computer-assisted translation
- Industry: Translation
- Founded: 2009
- Founders: Jack Welde and Andrey Akselrod
- Headquarters: New York City
- Website: www.smartling.com

Smartling is a cloud-based translation technology and language services company headquartered in New York City.

== History ==
The company was founded in 2009 by Jack Welde and Andrey Akselrod. In 2012 the company received its first funding beyond bootstrapping with an angel investment of $1.5 million. Its Series A funding was $4 million, and its Series B was $10 million. In its Series C funding it received an additional $24 million, and in its Series D it raised an additional $25 million. The company's valuation upon its Series D was $250 million.

In 2016, Smartling acquired VerbalizeIt, a firm producing translations for companies in the process of expanding internationally. As part of the acquisition, the company's founders and staff joined Smartling. In 2016, Smartling also acquired Jargon, a company involved in the localization of mobile apps.

== Translations ==
Smartling automatically translates digital content into foreign languages, and new content on client sites is flagged for translation and sent to translators for rewriting. When changes to the original language are detected, all foreign-language versions of the website or app are automatically flagged for translation within the platform. The changes are then delivered to front-end users through the back end of a client's system.

Moreover, the company works with a few thousand translators to provide translation services in addition to its in-house staff of about 300. The process involves translation, followed by a translation review, legal review, and editing. The company does text translations as well as audio and video translations. Its enterprise platform and translation services are cloud-based services. Additionally, Smartling also developed a "Mobile Localization Solution" and "Mobile Delivery Network" platforms to make updates to translations and localized content independent of app updates.

== See also ==
- Google Translate
- Duolingo
- Microsoft Translator
- vidby
- NeoSpeech
