= Meedan =

- Formation: 2005
- Founder: Ed Bice
- Type: Non-Profit Organization
- Legal status: 501(c)3 non-profit
- Headquarters: San Francisco, CA
- Executive Director: Dima Saber
- Board of directors: Ed Bice Jon Corshen Julie Owono Lea Endres Leah Wang Quinn McKew
- Website: meedan.org

Meedan is a technology not-for-profit that builds software and programmatic initiatives to strengthen journalism, digital literacy, and accessibility of information online and off.

Meedan builds an open-source software platform for fact-checking and content annotation and runs a service that brings together public health professionals to provide expertise and summaries of challenging public health concepts on request for journalists, fact-checking organizations, and media outlets. Meedan also runs a project to improve digital literacy, community-building and political engagement skills for citizen journalists, activists, journalism students, civil society organizations and human rights defenders through training, programming and research

== Background ==
Meedan, whose name means "gathering place" or "town square" in Arabic, began as a project to model boundary (language, culture, ideology) crossing "dialogue and collaboration" as the key to creating "understanding and tolerance" between different communities online and offline. A fundamental premise of the organization is that social technology on the web can play a part in enabling information equity and media literacy between the peoples of different regions, thereby helping to improve cross-cultural understanding. Meedan's vision is thus to "create a more equitable internet."

Meedan was founded by Ed Bice in 2005 and incorporated as a nonprofit charitable organization in 2006. Bice, who was formerly the Executive Director of The People's Opinion Project, retired as CEO in November 2025 and currently serves on Meedan's board of directors alongside Jon Corshen, Julie Owono, Lea Endres, Leah Wang, and Quinn McKew. Meedan's current Executive Director is Dr. Dima Saber.

In 2024, Meedan received a Skoll Award for Social Innovation in recognition of its work with over 50 newsrooms and fact-checking organizations and its support of 18 election and public health coalitions worldwide, including partnerships with organizations covering topics ranging from disaster response to the 2024 elections in Mexico, India, and the United States.

== Current projects ==
Meedan's Check software creates tiplines for fact-checking on encrypted platforms. This open-source software allows users of WhatsApp and other platforms to forward suspicious messages to misinformation tiplines operated by fact-checking organizations. Check's first major use was for Electionland, a 1,000-person collaborative reporting project led by ProPublica that tracked claims of voting issues on Election Day 2016.

== Past projects ==
=== Meedan.net ===
Launched in 2009, Meedan.net was Meedan's first project. It was a forum for cross-language conversation and media sharing in Arabic and English. Users could browse aggregated sources around world events – blogs and mainstream sources; opinion and reporting; Arabic and English writing – and help expand the news narrative by posting articles and comments themselves. All sources and comments were mirrored across Arabic and English using a combination of machine and human translation.

Meedan.net was included in the 2008 New York Times Magazine "Year in Ideas" issue: "It’s a lovely idea: a social-networking site with automatic translation bolted on. That’s Meedan, a gathering place for English and Arabic speakers who want to exchange thoughts on Middle East issues. Comments are translated automatically and instantly; Nebraska can now chat with Nablus."

Meedan's translation technology has been developed in collaboration with The Watson Research Group at IBM with which it entered into a research partnership in 2006. Development has focused on Machine and Machine Augmented Translation tools that enable users to improve translations collaboratively, including IBM's Transbrowser – a browser tool for creating a translation layer on the web.

=== Bridge ===
In 2015, Meedan built Bridge, a tool for social media translation using a combination of human and machine translation. Translators using the app could follow different topics or users, and when they saw a post they wanted to translate they could tap on it to start a translation. Once they got to the main translation screen, users could call up a machine translation from Bing.

=== Health Desk ===
Meedan's Health Desk software hosted a COVID-19 Vaccine Media Hub, which provided journalists and fact-checkers with a trusted source of evidence and experts they can turn to, as they report on the fast-evolving news around COVID-19 vaccines.

== Research ==
Meedan co-founded the Credibility Indicators Working Group, with Hacks/Hackers. The project had four core aims: to develop the framework of credibility indicators to test; to refine the process of credibility indicator development through testing and annotating a wide variety of articles; to evaluate the training data developed through these annotations in partnership with potential users, and to define this entire process for the coalition group members.

Meedan supported the release of a paper on diverse human feedback for AI models that went on to win Best Paper in the datasets and benchmarks track at the 2024 Conference on Neural Information Processing Systems (NeurIPS 2024).
