= Storify =

Storify Inc.
- Website type: Social network service, Journalism, Blogging, Consumer web
- Available in: English
- Founded: San Francisco, California, U.S.
- Headquarters: 149 9th St., Suite 404 San Francisco, CA 94103
- Founders: Xavier Damman; Burt Herman
- Key people: Xavier Damman (CEO)
- Industry: Internet
- Parent: Adobe Systems
- Website: Storify.com
- Registration: Sign up using Twitter, Facebook, or create free account
- Launched: 2010
- Current status: Shut down

Storify was a social network service that let the user create stories or timelines using social media such as Twitter, Facebook and Instagram. Storify was launched in September 2010, and had been open to the public since April 2011. Storify was shut down on May 16, 2018.

In September 2013, Storify was acquired by Livefyre, in turn acquired by Adobe Systems in May 2016. The standalone service was discontinued on May 16, 2018, with users being directed to "Storify 2" as part of the Adobe Experience Manager Livefyre product.

== Use ==
Media organizations used Storify in coverage of ongoing news stories such as elections, meetings and events. Poynter.org recommended using Storify for covering social movements, breaking news, internet humor and memes, reactions and conversations, and extreme weather. CBC used Storify to cover the 2011 London riots, TRT World used Storify to cover the UK general election 2015 and Al Jazeera has a show called The Stream that collected perspectives on news stories using Storify.

== Features ==
The main purpose of Storify was to allow users to create stories by importing content from various forms of media into a timeline. Users were able to search for content related to their story from sources such as YouTube, Twitter (one of the more popular ones), Instagram, Flickr, and Google, as well as other stories on Storify, and then drag that content into their own Storify story timelines. Users could add comments to the links that they provided within their stories, and could also embed URLs in their stories. Users could also embed their own Storify stories for content syndication elsewhere on the internet.

== History ==
Storify launched its private beta as a finalist at TechCrunch Disrupt in September 2010. It won the Startup Accelerator at South by Southwest in 2011. The company received $2 million in funding from Khosla Ventures. Storify's public beta went live in late April 2011. TIME rated Storify as one of the 50 best websites of 2011.

The concept was created in 2010 by co-founders Burt Herman and Xavier Damman. The website got its current name from the obsolete, former dictionary word: storify. Storify means "to form or tell stories". Burt Herman worked as a correspondent at the Associated Press where the word storify was regularly used by editors.

On December 12, 2017, Storify announced that no new accounts could be created as of that date, and that its standalone website would be shut down effective May 16, 2018, as it only supports the "Storify 2" version built into the enterprise Adobe Experience Manager Livefyre product.

== Traffic information ==
As of October 2014, Storify had a global Alexa rank of #3,961 and over 50,000 sites linking in. Internet averages indicated that most Storify users were women between 25 and 34 years of age who had no children and browsed the site from work.
