= Aegisub =

Open-source computer program for subtitle editing

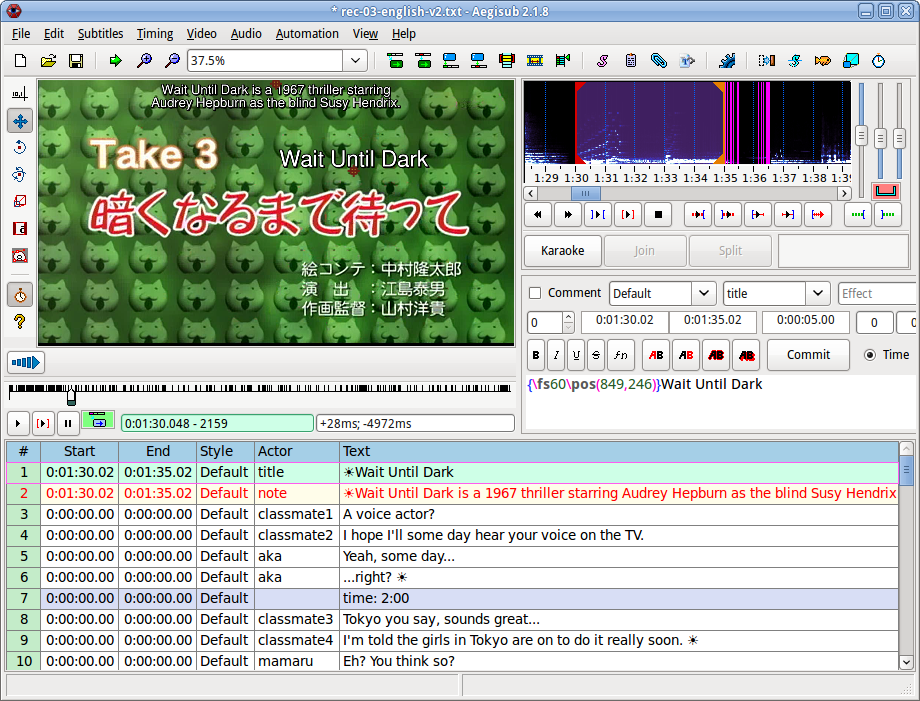
- Aegisub demonstrating visual typesetting and karaoke features
- Developers: Niels Martin Hansen, Rodrigo Braz Monteiro, Thomas Goyne, and others
- Stable release: 3.5.1 / October 17, 2026; 18 days ago
- Written in: C++, Lua
- Operating system: Windows, macOS, Linux and FreeBSD
- Available in: 34 languages
- List of languages English, Arabic, Basque, Belarusian, Brazilian Portuguese, Bulgarian, Catalan, Czech, Danish, Dutch, Finnish, French, Galician, German, Greek, Hungarian, Indonesian, Italian, Japanese, Korean, Lithuanian, Persian, Polish, Portuguese, Russian, Serbian (Cyrillic), Serbian (Latin), Simplified Chinese, Spanish, Thai, Traditional Chinese, Turkish, Ukrainian, Vietnamese
- Type: Subtitles
- License: 3-clause BSD License
- Website: https://aegisub.org/
- Repository: https://github.com/TypesettingTools/Aegisub

Aegisub is a subtitle editing application. It is the main tool used for fansubbing, the practice of creating or translating unofficial subtitles for visual media by fans. It is the successor of the original SubStation Alpha and Sabbu.

Aegisub's design emphasizes timing, styling of subtitles, and the creation of karaoke videos. It allows for many video processing bindings to process the timing, such as FFmpeg and AviSynth. It can also be extended with the Lua and MoonScript scripting languages.

The application's native subtitle format is Advanced SubStation Alpha, which supports subtitle positioning and styling. Aegisub can export subtitles to other common formats as well, such as SubRip's ".srt" format, but at the cost of losing all other features except for raw text and basic timing.

In fansubbing, Aegisub is used when translating and interpreting languages, creating and adjusting timing, editing subtitles, typesetting, quality checking, karaoke lyric timing and karaoke text effects. However, different tools can be used to achieve the same effect, such as Adobe Premiere Pro for typesetting, or a simple text editor like Notepad++ when providing translated text.

== History ==
=== Early development ===
Aegisub was started in 2005 by Niels Martin Hansen and Rodrigo Braz Monteiro as a replacement for the subtitle editor Medusa.

Thomas Goyne later became a principal maintainer of the project. Aegisub 3.0 was released in October 2012, followed by several maintenance releases. Version 3.2.2, released on December 8, 2014, was the last official stable release for approximately ten years.

Although official stable releases stopped, development continued through unofficial builds and independent forks of the source code.

=== Forks ===
Following the slowdown in official releases, several forks of Aegisub emerged to maintain compatibility with newer operating systems and libraries and to introduce additional features.

One fork, maintained by wangqr, introduced improvements to the build system, high-DPI compatibility and application stability. It later incorporated a CMake build system, further stability improvements, and changes to video and audio handling.

Another fork was developed under the TypesettingTools organization by contributors including CoffeeFlux and line0. It initially focused on fixes and improvements relevant to fansubbing, including improvements to video colour-space conversion. The project subsequently undertook a migration to the Meson build system to simplify compilation across different platforms. This work helped prepare the project for new stable releases.

In 2022, arch1t3cht started a fork based on the TypesettingTools codebase. It incorporated changes from other forks and introduced additional features, including video zoom, line folding, additional audio and video providers, and improvements to the automation API. The fork became an important version used by some fansubbing groups while development of the main project continued.

A separate fork, AegisubDC, maintained by Ristellise, also provided updated Windows builds and additional features, including video panning and zooming. Its active development ended in March 2022, and the repository was subsequently archived.

=== New stable releases ===
Following the TypesettingTools fork's development, CoffeeFlux received access to the original Aegisub repository to help prepare a new stable release. The project's website, which had been unavailable, was restored, and development work continued to address outstanding build-system and compatibility issues.

On December 18, 2024, Aegisub 3.4.0 was released, marking the return of stable releases after approximately ten years. The TypesettingTools repository became the official repository for continued development, with CoffeeFlux and arch1t3cht among its principal maintainers.

Versions 3.4.1 and 3.4.2 followed in January 2025, primarily addressing bugs and packaging issues discovered after the 3.4.0 release.

Version 3.5.0 was released on October 4, 2026. It introduced video panning and zooming, improved high-DPI support, native builds for Apple Silicon, and the ability to copy or save rendered subtitles as images with transparent backgrounds. It also introduced improvements to subtitle script resolution, video colour-matrix handling and audio timing tools.

The release also addressed security vulnerability CVE-2026-92705, which could allow arbitrary code execution through automation scripts referenced by a specially crafted subtitle file. Aegisub was updated to ask users for confirmation before loading associated automation scripts.

Version 3.5.1 was released on October 17, 2026. It included fixes for startup crashes on some macOS versions, problems loading native modules in automation scripts, and other issues affecting application stability and subtitle editing.

== See also ==
- Comparison of subtitle editors
- List of free television software
