= Subtitles =

Text representing audiovisual content

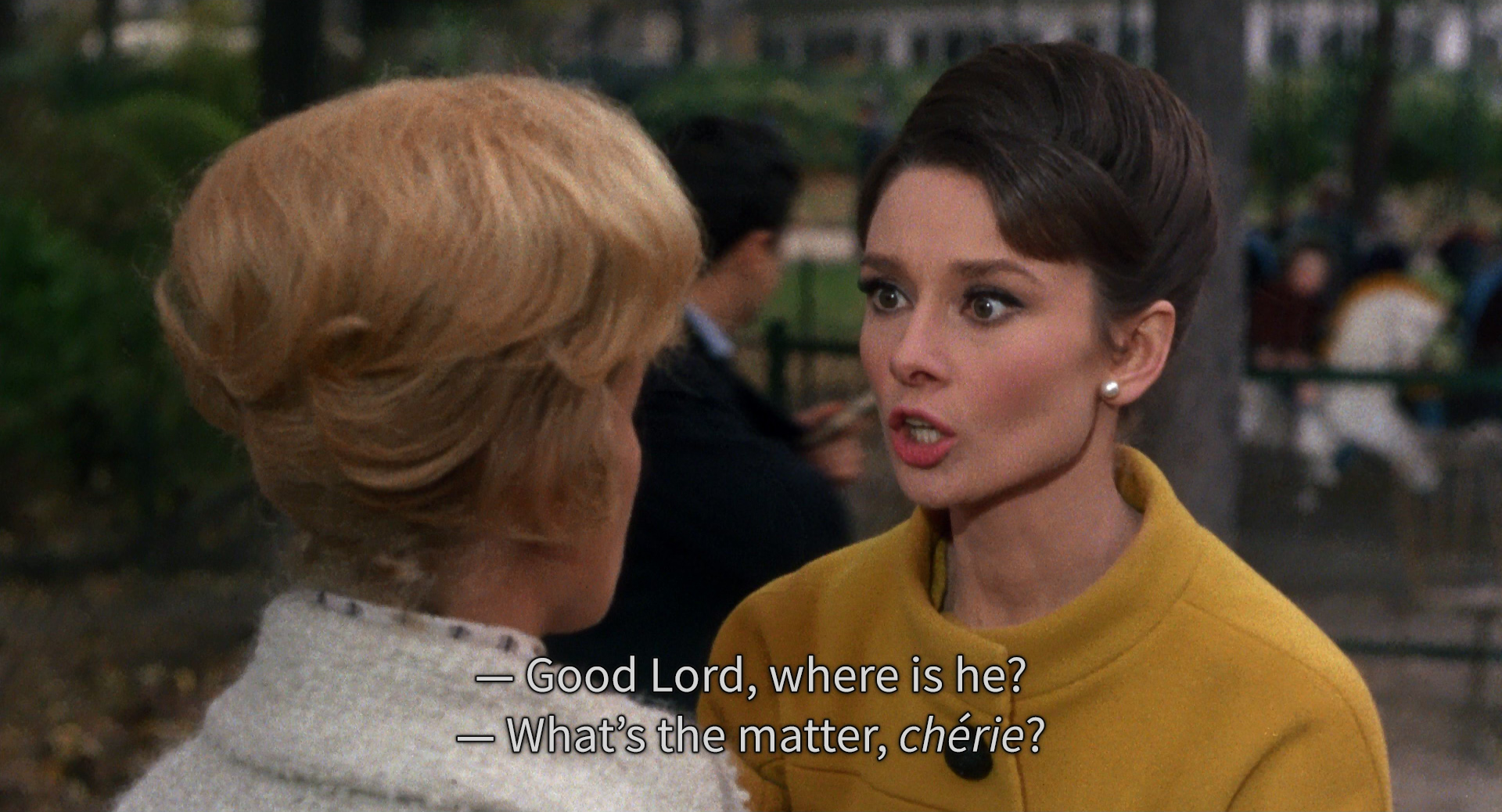
A scene from the 1963 film Charade, showing dialogue spoken by Audrey Hepburn and Dominique Minot subtitled in English. Quotation dashes are used to differentiate between speakers.

Subtitles are texts representing the contents of the audio in a film, television show, opera or other audiovisual media. Subtitles might provide a transcription or translation of spoken dialogue. Although naming conventions can vary, captions are subtitles that include written descriptions of other elements of the audio, like music or sound effects. Captions are thus especially helpful to deaf or hard-of-hearing people. Subtitles may also add information that is not present in the audio. Localizing subtitles provide cultural context to viewers. For example, a subtitle could be used to explain to an audience unfamiliar with sake that it is a type of Japanese wine. Lastly, subtitles are sometimes used for humor, as in Annie Hall, where subtitles show the characters' inner thoughts, which contradict what they were saying in the audio.

Creating, delivering, and displaying subtitles is a complicated and multi-step endeavor. First, the text of the subtitles needs to be written. When there is plenty of time to prepare, this process can be done by hand. However, for media produced in real-time, like live television, it may be done by stenographers or using automated speech recognition. Subtitles written by fans, rather than more official sources, are referred to as fansubs. Regardless of who does the writing, they must include information on when each line of text should be displayed.

Second, subtitles need to be distributed to the audience. Open subtitles are added directly to recorded video frames and thus cannot be removed once added. On the other hand, closed subtitles are stored separately, allowing subtitles in different languages to be used without changing the video itself. In either case, a wide variety of technical approaches and formats are used to encode the subtitles.

Third, subtitles need to be displayed to the audience. Open subtitles are always shown whenever the video is played because they are part of it. However, displaying closed subtitles is optional since they are overlaid onto the video by whatever is playing it. For example, media player software might be used to combine closed subtitles with the video itself. In some theaters or venues, a dedicated screen or screens are used to display subtitles. If that dedicated screen is above rather than below the main display area, the subtitles are called surtitles.

== Methods ==
Sometimes, mainly at film festivals, subtitles may be shown on a separate display below the screen, thus saving the filmmaker from creating a subtitled copy for just one showing.

== Creation, delivery, and display of subtitles ==
Professional subtitlers usually work with specialized computer software and hardware where the video is stored digitally, making each frame instantly accessible. Besides creating the subtitles, the subtitler usually tells the computer software the timing and duration of each subtitle. These markers are usually based on timecode if it is a work for electronic media (e.g., TV, video, DVD) or on film length (measured in feet and frames). For cinema exhibition, this task is undertaken by a specialist or team of specialists.

The finished subtitle file is used to add the subtitles to the picture, either:

- directly into the picture (open subtitles);
- embedded in the vertical interval and later superimposed on the picture by the end user with the help of an external decoder or a decoder built into the TV (closed subtitles on TV or video);
- or converted (rendered) to TIFF or BMP graphics that are later superimposed on the picture by the end user's equipment (closed subtitles on DVD or as part of a DVB broadcast).

Subtitles can also be created by individuals using freely available subtitle-creation software such as Subtitle Workshop, MovieCaptioner, and Subtitle Composer, and then hardcode them onto a video file with software such as VirtualDub in combination with VSFilter (which could also be used to show subtitles as softsubs in many software video players).

For multimedia-style Webcasting, check:

- SMIL Synchronized Multimedia Integration Language;
- Timed Text DFXP.

=== Automatic captioning ===
Some programs and online software allow automatic captions, constructed mainly by way of speech-to-text technology. For example, on YouTube, automatic captions are available in a variety of languages.

Automatic captions are generally less accurate than human-typed captions as they regularly fail to distinguish between homophones—similar-sounding words, such as "to", "two", and "too". This can be particularly disruptive to the ready understanding of educational material, such as lecture recordings, that can often include uncommon vocabulary and proper nouns. This problem can be compounded if audio quality is poor, if the speaker is indistinct, or if multiple speakers overlap. Disability-rights groups have emphasised the need for automatic captions to be human-reviewed prior to publication, particularly in cases where students' grades may be adversely affected by such inadequate captioning.

== Same-language captions ==
Same-language captions, i.e., those which do not provide a translation, are primarily intended as an aid for the Deaf or hard-of-hearing.

=== Closed captions (CC) ===
The "CC in a TV" symbol Jack Foley created, while senior graphic designer at Boston public broadcaster WGBH that invented captioning for television, is public domain so that anyone who captions TV programs can use it.

Closed captioning is the American term for closed subtitles specifically intended for people who are deaf or hard-of-hearing. These are a transcription rather than a translation, and usually also contain lyrics and descriptions of important non-dialogue audio such as (SIGHS), (WIND HOWLING), ("SONG TITLE" PLAYING), (KISSES), (THUNDER RUMBLING), (LAUGHTER), (PANTING), (CAT YOWLS), (GLASS SHATTERS) and (DOOR CREAKING). From the expression "closed captions", the word "caption" has in recent years come to mean a subtitle intended for the deaf or hard-of-hearing, be it "open" or "closed" (respectively meaning built-in or selectable and optional). In British English, "subtitles" usually refers to subtitles for the deaf or hard-of-hearing (SDH); however, the term "SDH" is sometimes used when there is a need to make a distinction between the two.

==== Real time ====
Programs such as news bulletins, current affairs programs, sports, some talk shows, and political and special events utilize real time or online captioning. Live captioning is increasingly common, especially in the United Kingdom and the United States, as a result of regulations that stipulate that virtually all TV eventually must be accessible for people who are deaf and hard-of-hearing. In practice, however, these "real time" subtitles will typically lag the audio by several seconds due to the inherent delay in transcribing, encoding, and transmitting the subtitles. Real time subtitles are also challenged by typographic errors or mishearing of the spoken words, with no time available to correct before transmission.

===== Pre-prepared =====
Some programs may be prepared in their entirety several hours before broadcast, but with insufficient time to prepare a timecoded caption file for automatic play-out. Pre-prepared captions look similar to offline captions, although the accuracy of cueing may be compromised slightly as the captions are not locked to program timecode.

Newsroom captioning involves the automatic transfer of text from the newsroom computer system to a device which outputs it as captions. It does work, but its suitability as an exclusive system would only apply to programs which had been scripted in their entirety on the newsroom computer system, such as short interstitial updates.

In the United States and Canada, some broadcasters have used it exclusively and simply left uncaptioned sections of the bulletin for which a script was unavailable. Newsroom captioning limits captions to pre-scripted materials and, therefore, does not cover all of the news, weather and sports segments of a typical local news broadcast which are typically not pre-scripted. This includes last-second breaking news or changes to the scripts, ad-lib conversations of the broadcasters, and emergency or other live remote broadcasts by reporters in-the-field. By failing to cover items such as these, newsroom style captioning (or use of the teleprompter for captioning) typically results in coverage of less than 30% of a local news broadcast.

===== Live =====
Communication access real-time translation (CART) stenographers, who use a computer with using either stenotype or Velotype keyboards to transcribe stenographic input for presentation as captions within two or three seconds of the representing audio, must caption anything which is purely live and unscripted; however, more recent developments include operators using speech recognition software and re-voicing the dialogue. Speech recognition technology has advanced so quickly in the United States that about half of all live captioning was through speech recognition as of 2005. Real-time captions look different from offline captions, as they are presented as a continuous flow of text as people speak.

Stenography is a system of rendering words phonetically, and English, with its multitude of homophones (e.g., there, their, they're), is particularly unsuited to easy transcriptions. Stenographers working in courts and inquiries usually have 24 hours in which to deliver their transcripts. Consequently, they may enter the same phonetic stenographic codes for a variety of homophones, and fix up the spelling later. Real-time stenographers must deliver their transcriptions accurately and immediately. They must therefore develop techniques for keying homophones differently, and be unswayed by the pressures of delivering accurate product on immediate demand.

Submissions to recent captioning-related inquiries have revealed concerns from broadcasters about captioning sports. Captioning sports may also affect many different people because of the weather outside of it. In much sport captioning's absence, the Australian Caption Centre submitted to the National Working Party on Captioning (NWPC), in November 1998, three examples of sport captioning, each performed on tennis, rugby league and swimming programs:

- Heavily reduced: Captioners ignore commentary and provide only scores and essential information such as "try" or "out".
- Significantly reduced: Captioners use QWERTY input to type summary captions yielding the essence of what the commentators are saying, delayed due to the limitations of QWERTY input.
- Comprehensive realtime: Captioners use stenography to caption the commentary in its entirety.

The NWPC concluded that the standard they accept is the comprehensive real-time method, which gives them access to the commentary in its entirety. Also, not all sports are live. Many events are pre-recorded hours before they are broadcast, allowing a captioner to caption them using offline methods.

===== Hybrid =====
Because different programs are produced under different conditions, a case-by-case basis must consequently determine captioning methodology. Some bulletins may have a high incidence of truly live material, or insufficient access to video feeds and scripts may be provided to the captioning facility, making stenography unavoidable. Other bulletins may be pre-recorded just before going to air, making pre-prepared text preferable.

News captioning applications currently available are designed to accept text from a variety of inputs: stenography, Velotype, QWERTY, ASCII import, and the newsroom computer. This allows one facility to handle a variety of online captioning requirements and to ensure that captioners properly caption all programs.

Current affairs programs usually require stenographic assistance. Even though the segments which comprise a current affairs program may be produced in advance, they are usually done so just before on-air time and their duration makes QWERTY input of text unfeasible.

News bulletins, on the other hand, can often be captioned without stenographic input (unless there are live crosses or ad-libbing by the presenters). This is because:

- Most items are scripted on the newsroom computer system and this text can be electronically imported into the captioning system.
- Individual news stories are of short duration, so even if they are made available only just prior to broadcast, there is still time to use QWERTY in text.

==== Offline ====
For non-live, or pre-recorded programs, television program providers can choose offline captioning. Captioners gear offline captioning toward the high-end television industry, providing highly customized captioning features, such as pop-on style captions, specialized screen placement, speaker identifications, italics, special characters, and sound effects.

Offline captioning involves a five-step design and editing process, and does much more than simply display the text of a program. Offline captioning helps the viewer follow a story line, become aware of mood and feeling, and allows them to fully enjoy the entire viewing experience. Offline captioning is the preferred presentation style for entertainment-type programming.

=== Subtitles for the deaf or hard-of-hearing (SDH) ===
Subtitles for the deaf or hard-of-hearing (SDH) is an American term introduced by the DVD industry. It refers to regular subtitles in the original language where important non-dialogue information has been added, as well as speaker identification, which may be useful when the viewer cannot otherwise visually tell who is saying what.

The only significant difference for the user between SDH subtitles and closed captions is their appearance: SDH subtitles usually are displayed with the same proportional font used for the translation subtitles on the DVD; however, closed captions are displayed as white text on a black band, which blocks a large portion of the view. Closed captioning is falling out of favor as many users have no difficulty reading SDH subtitles, which are text with contrast outline. In addition, DVD subtitles can specify many colors on the same character: primary, outline, shadow, and background. This allows subtitlers to display subtitles on a usually translucent band for easier reading; however, this is rare, since most subtitles use an outline and shadow instead, in order to block a smaller portion of the picture. Closed captions may still supersede DVD subtitles, since many SDH subtitles present all of the text centered (an example of this is DVDs and Blu-ray Discs manufactured by Warner Bros.), while closed captions usually specify position on the screen: centered, left align, right align, top, etc. This is helpful for speaker identification and overlapping conversation. Some SDH subtitles (such as the subtitles of newer Universal Pictures DVDs and Blu-ray Discs and most 20th Century Fox DVDs and Blu-ray Discs and some Columbia Pictures DVDs and Blu-ray Discs) do have positioning, but it is not as common.

DVDs for the U.S. market now sometimes have three forms of English subtitles: SDH subtitles; English subtitles, helpful for viewers who may not be hearing impaired but whose first language may not be English (although they are usually an exact transcript and not simplified); and closed caption data that is decoded by the end-user's closed caption decoder. Most anime releases in the U.S. only include translations of the original material as subtitles; therefore, SDH subtitles of English dubs ("dubtitles") are uncommon.

High-definition disc media (HD DVD, Blu-ray Disc) uses SDH subtitles as the sole method because technical specifications do not require HD to support line 21 closed captions. Some Blu-ray Discs, however, are said to carry a closed caption stream that only displays through standard-definition connections. Many HDTVs allow the end-user to customize the captions, including the ability to remove the black band.

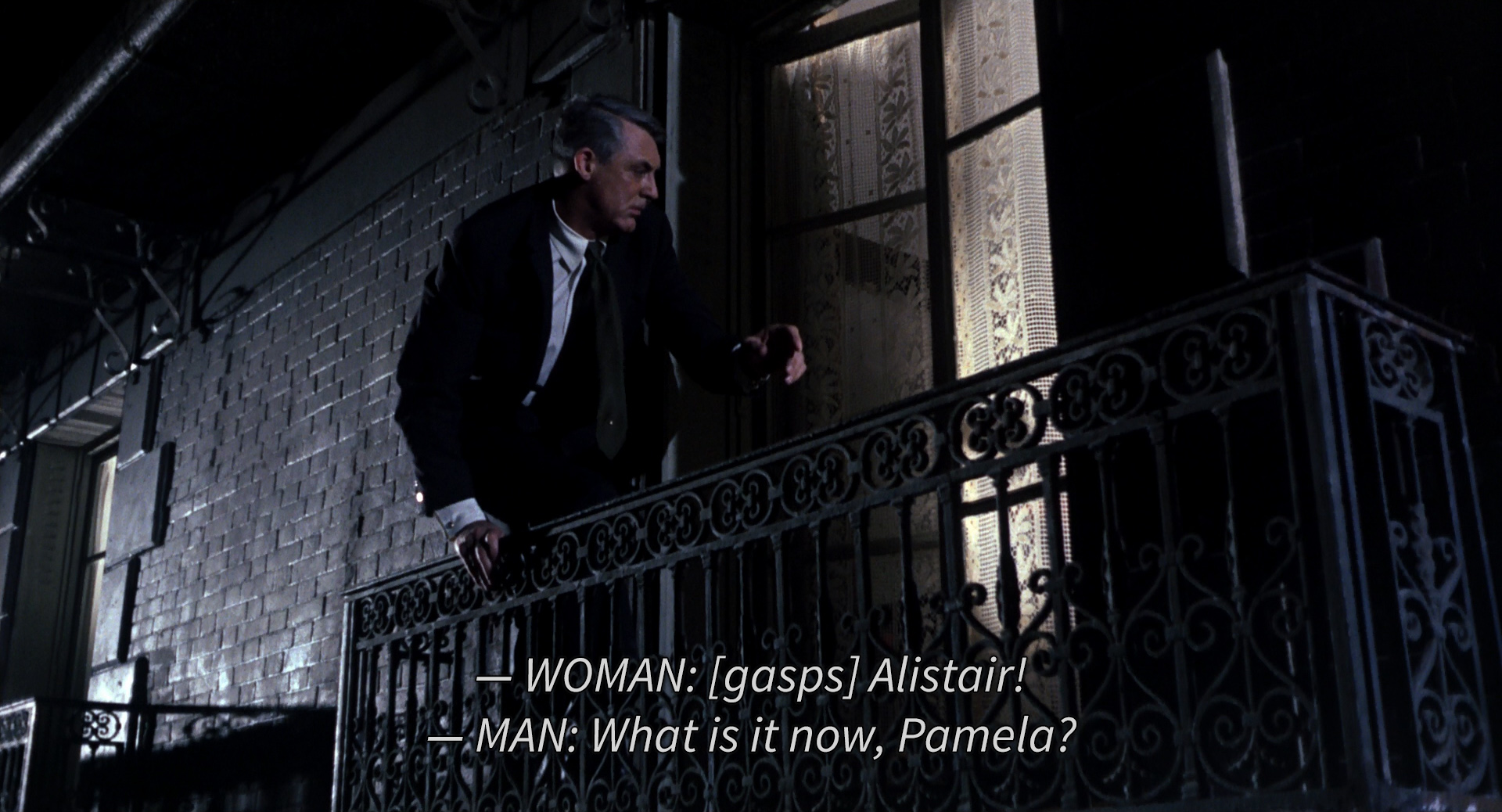
Example of speaker ID in SDH (voices are off-screen)

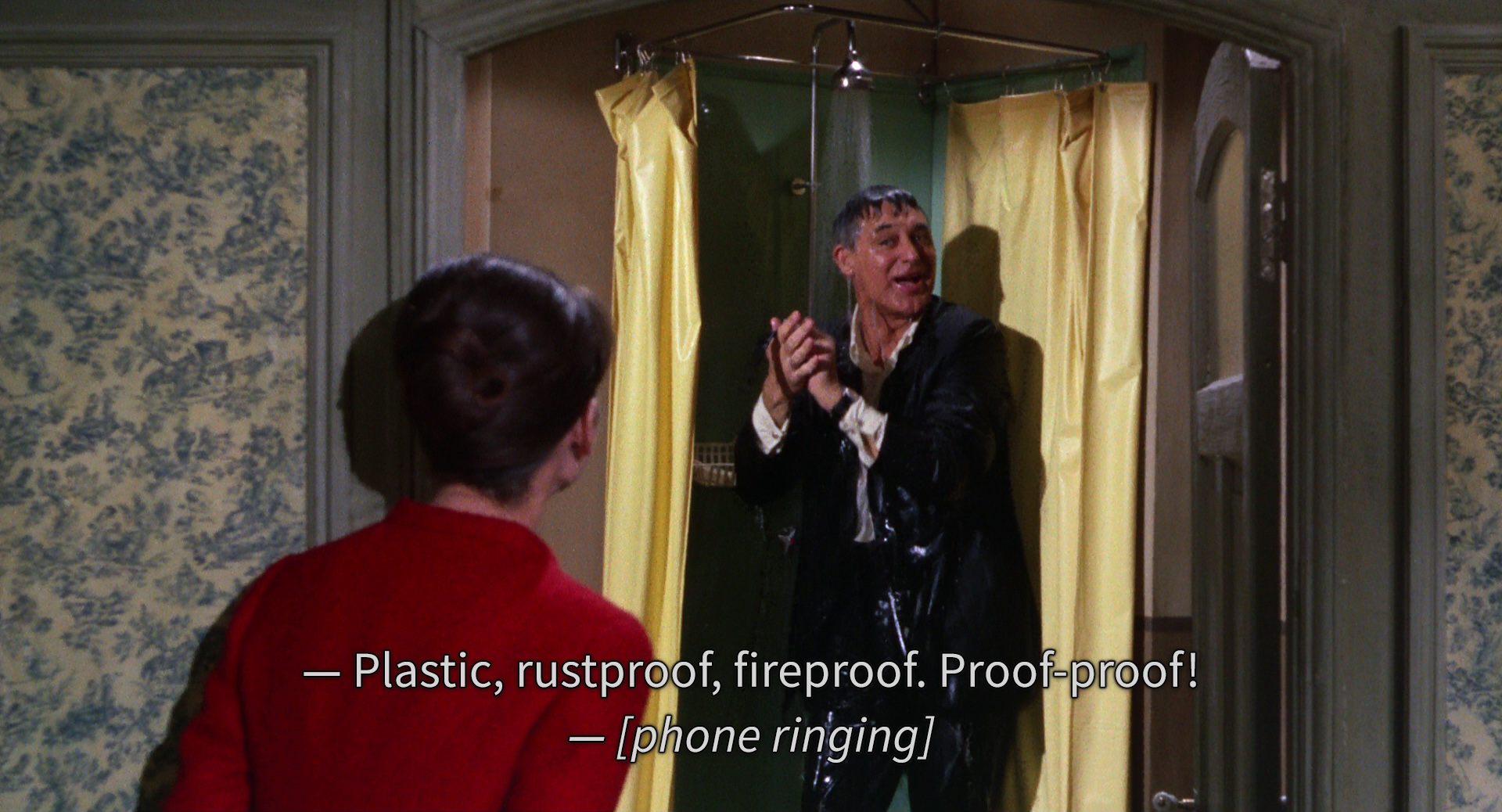
Example of non-speech information in SDH (source is off-screen)

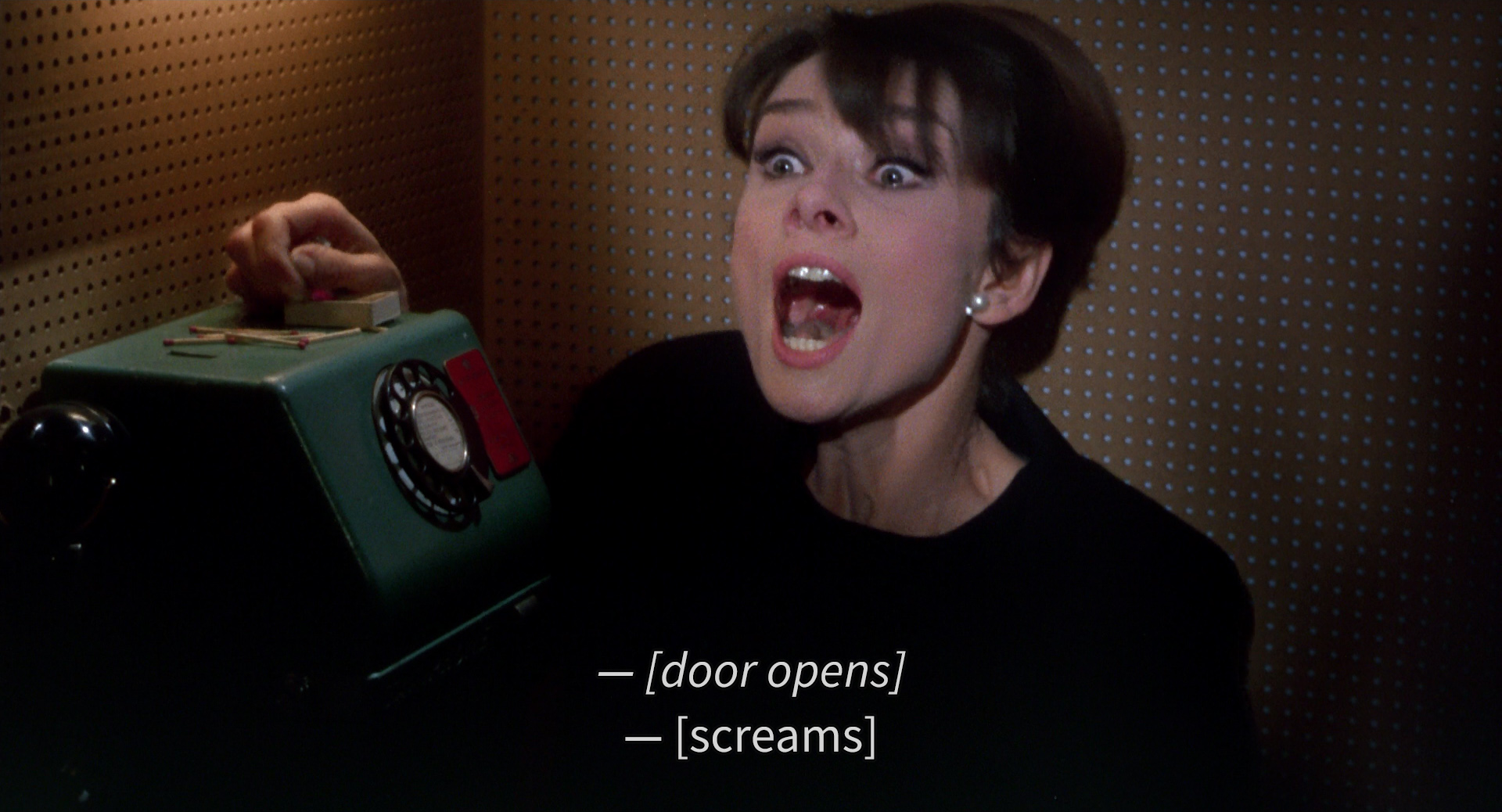
Example of non-speech information in SDH (two sources: off-screen and on-screen)

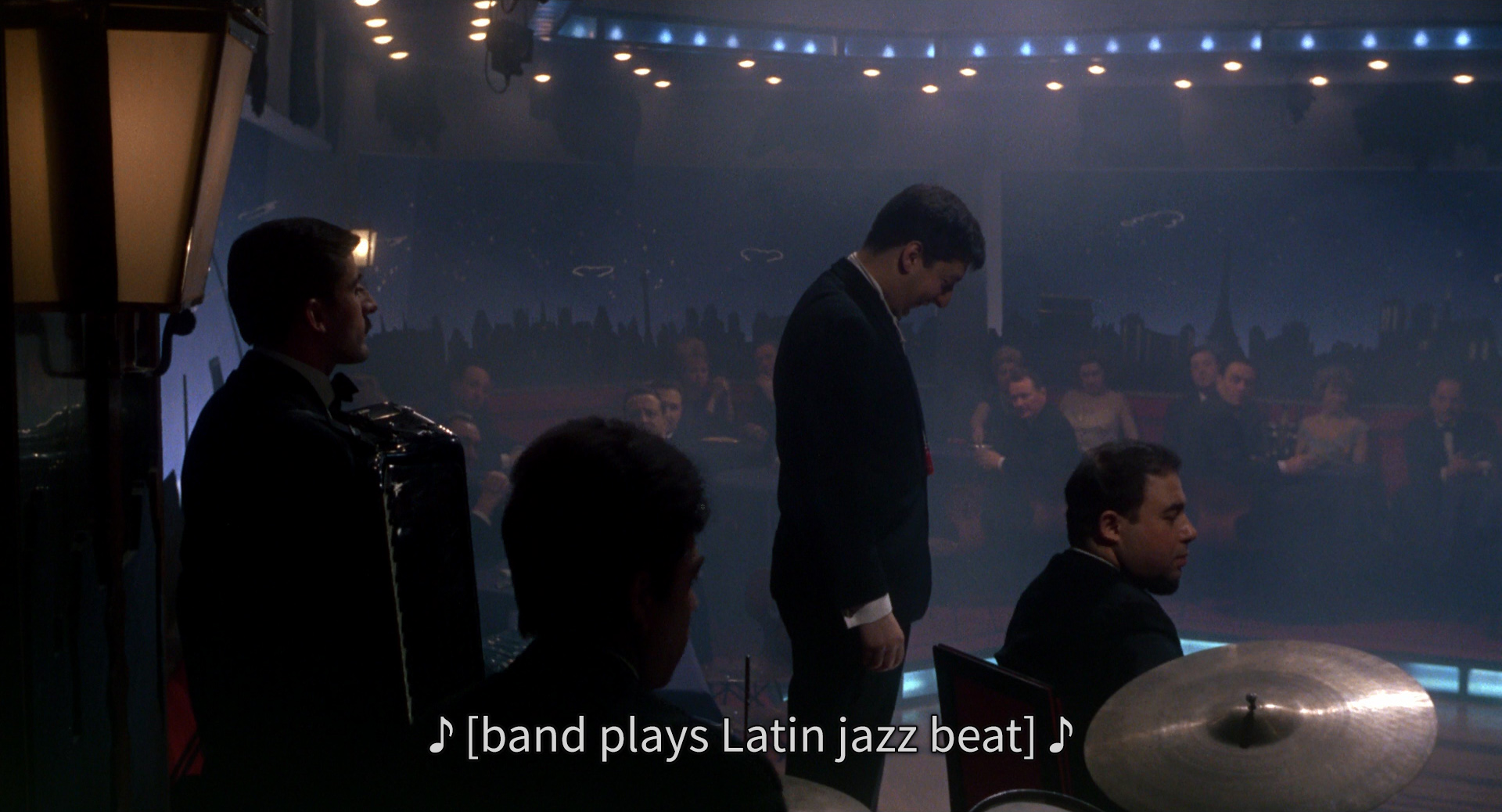
Example of music description in SDH

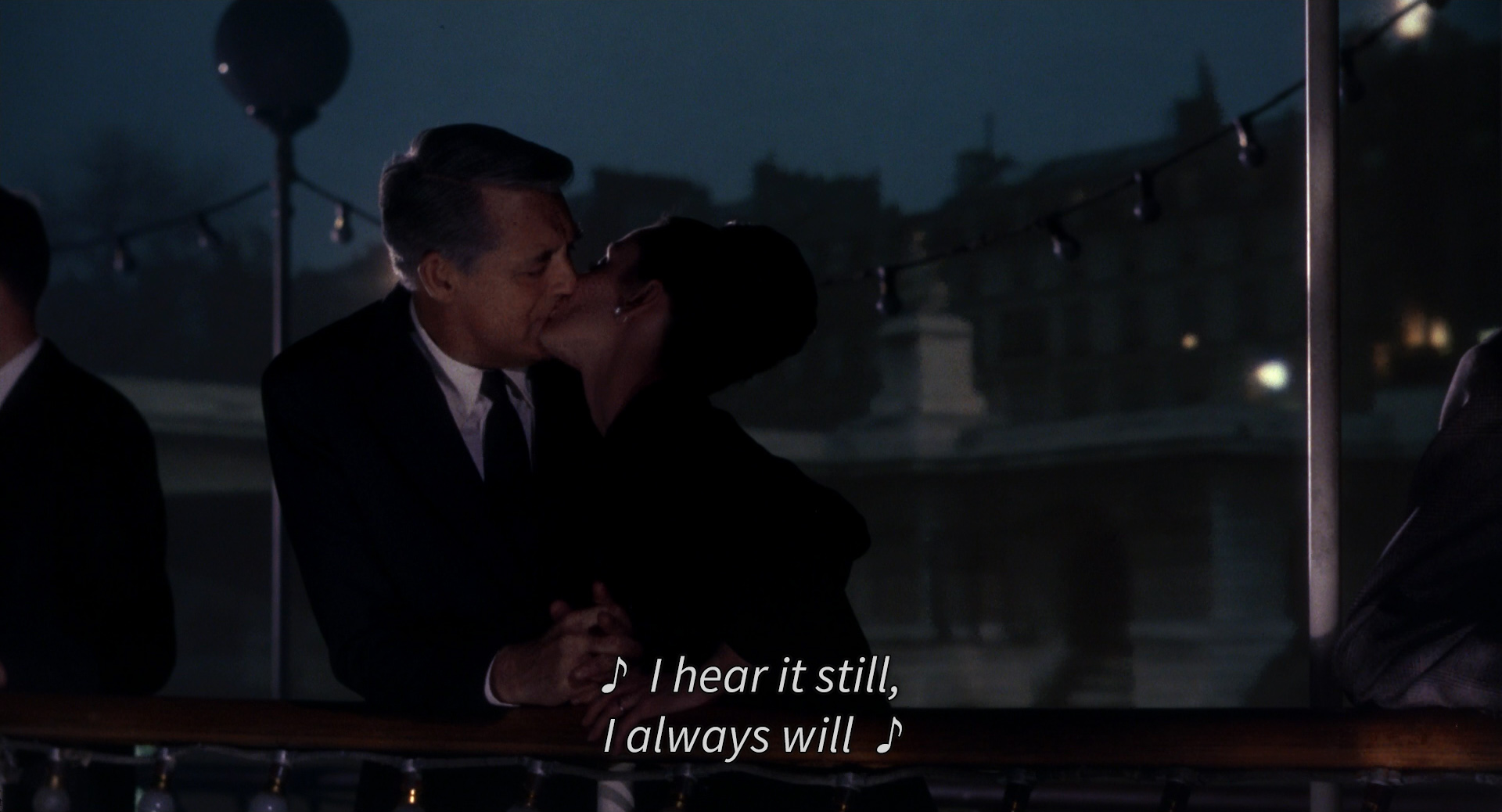
Example of lyrics transcription in SDH

Song lyrics are not always captioned, as additional copyright permissions may be required to reproduce the lyrics on-screen as part of the subtitle track. In October 2015, major studios and Netflix were sued over this practice, citing claims of false advertising (as the work is henceforth not completely subtitled) and civil rights violations (under California's Unruh Civil Rights Act, guaranteeing equal rights for people with disabilities). Judge Stephen Victor Wilson dismissed the suit in September 2016, ruling that allegations of civil rights violations did not present evidence of intentional discrimination against viewers with disabilities, and that allegations over misrepresenting the extent of subtitles "fall far short of demonstrating that reasonable consumers would actually be deceived as to the amount of subtitled content provided, as there are no representations whatsoever that all song lyrics would be captioned, or even that the content would be 'fully' captioned."

=== Use by hearing people ===
Although same-language subtitles and captions are produced primarily with the deaf and hard-of-hearing in mind, many others use them for convenience (the curb cut effect), or to understand unclear dialogue. A 2021 UK survey found that 80% of viewers between 18 and 25 regularly used subtitles, while less than a quarter of those between 56 and 75 did.

The increase in incomprehensible dialogue, and hence the increase in subtitle use by hearing people, has been attributed to

- advances in microphone technology that enable actors to speak more softly and mumble,
- an increasing unwillingness by studios to spend money on re-recording unclear dialogue,
- constraints in the downmixing of theatrical surround sound to the stereo or mono playback of home televisions, phones, or computers, and
- a desire by filmmakers to create a high dynamic range by contrasting dialogue with loud effects such as explosions.

Some directors are unconcerned with the intelligibility of their dialogue. Christopher Nolan, for instance, has said "We got a lot of complaints... I actually got calls from other filmmakers who would say, 'I just saw your film and the dialogue is inaudible.' Some people thought maybe the music's too loud, but the truth was it was kind of the whole enchilada of how we had chosen to mix it."

=== Same-language subtitling ===
Same language subtitling (SLS) is the use of synchronized captioning of musical lyrics (or any text with an audio or video source) as a repeated reading activity. The basic reading activity involves students viewing a short subtitled presentation projected onscreen, while completing a response worksheet. To be really effective, the subtitling should have high quality synchronization of audio and text, and better yet, subtitling should change color in syllabic synchronization to audio model, and the text should be at a level to challenge students' language abilities.

In the mid-1980s Pioneer introduced a range of Laserdisc based Karaoke machines, with subtitled Music video playback combined with a Karaoke PA system, the concept was subsequently adapted for the 1986 multi-format Disney Sing-Along Songs series, and later transferred to the PlayStation 2, and subsequent games consoles, and has in parallel been adapted to classroom use of synchronized captioning of musical lyrics (or any text with an Audio and/or Video source) as a Repeated Reading activity.

Studies (including those by the University of Nottingham and the What Works Clearinghouse of the United States Department of Education) have found that use of subtitles can help promote reading comprehension in school-aged children. Same-language captioning can improve literacy and reading growth across a broad range of reading abilities. It is used for this purpose by national television broadcasters in China and in India such as Doordarshan.

==== Asia ====
In some Asian television programming, captioning is considered a part of the genre, and has evolved beyond simply capturing what is being said. The captions are used artistically; it is common to see the words appear one by one as they are spoken, in a multitude of fonts, colors, and sizes that capture the spirit of what is being said. Languages like Japanese also have a rich vocabulary of onomatopoeia which is used in captioning.

Brij Kothari believed that SLS makes reading practice an incidental, automatic, and subconscious part of popular TV entertainment, at a low per-person cost to shore up literacy rates in India. Kothari was watching a Spanish film on video with English subtitles during a break from dissertation writing in 1996 when the thought hit him that if all Hindi film songs were subtitled in Hindi, on television in India, it would bring about a revolution in literacy. Upon completion of his academic pursuits Kothari returned to India. In late 1996 he joined the faculty of the Indian Institute of Management in Ahmedabad. While continuing to teach communication to MBA students, he started work on SLS and it became a project of IIM. The idea of SLS was first innovated, researched, pioneered and nationalized by the Centre for Educational Innovation, Indian Institute of Management, Ahmedabad under Kothari. The program took off on a national scale by August 2002. Before Kothari's study, most available research on captioning had demonstrated limited results. As a direct result of Kothari's success with subtitled music video there are several new related studies using technology and music video that are also showing remarkable results. SLS has been implemented on Doordarshan's film song programmes in Hindi, Bengali, Gujarati, Marathi, Telugu, Tamil, Kannada, Malayalam, Odia, and Punjabi. For each language the subtitles are in the same language as the audio.

A 2002–2007 Nielsen-ORG study demonstrated that the ability to read a paragraph among schoolchildren jumped from 25% to 56% when exposed to 30 minutes a week of the Rangoli program with subtitles. Over 90% said they prefer having subtitles on songs owing to their interest in the lyrics.

===== Chinese-speaking world =====
In some East Asian countries, especially Chinese-speaking ones, subtitling is common in all taped television programs and films. In these countries, written text remains mostly uniform while regional dialects in the spoken form can be mutually unintelligible. Therefore, subtitling offers a distinct advantage to aid comprehension. With subtitles, programs in Mandarin or any dialect can be understood by viewers unfamiliar with it.

According to HK Magazine, the practice to caption in Standard Chinese was pioneered in Hong Kong during the 1960s by Run Run Shaw of Shaw Brothers Studio. In a bid to reach the largest audience possible, Shaw had already recorded his films in Mandarin, reasoning it would be most universal variety of Chinese. However, this did not guarantee that the films could be understood by non-Mandarin-speaking audiences, and dubbing into different varieties was seen as too costly. The decision was thus made to include Standard Chinese subtitles in all Shaw Brothers films. As the films were made in British-ruled Hong Kong, Shaw also decided to include English subtitles to reach English speakers in Hong Kong and allow for exports outside Asia.

===== Japanese reality television =====
On-screen subtitles as seen in Japanese variety and other reality television shows are more for decorative purpose, something that is not seen in television in Europe and the Americas. Some shows even place sound effects over those subtitles. This practice of subtitling has been spread to neighbouring countries including South Korea and Taiwan. ATV in Hong Kong once practiced this style of decorative subtitles on its variety shows while it was owned by Want Want Holdings in Taiwan (which also owns CTV and CTI) during 2009.

== Translation ==
Translation basically means conversion of one language into another language in written or spoken form. Subtitles can be used to translate dialogue from a foreign language into the native language of the audience. It is not only the quickest and cheapest method of translating content, but is also usually preferred as it is possible for the audience to hear the original dialogue and voices of the actors.

Subtitle translation may be different from the translation of written text or written language. Usually, during the process of creating subtitles for a film or television program, the picture and each sentence of the audio are analyzed by the subtitle translator; also, the subtitle translator may or may not have access to a written transcript of the dialogue. Especially in the field of commercial subtitles, the subtitle translator often interprets what is meant, rather than translating the manner in which the dialogue is stated; that is, the meaning is more important than the form—the audience does not always appreciate this, as it can be frustrating for people who are familiar with some of the spoken language; spoken language may contain verbal padding or culturally implied meanings that cannot be conveyed in the written subtitles. Also, the subtitle translator may also condense the dialogue to achieve an acceptable reading speed, whereby purpose is more important than form.

Especially in fansubs, the subtitle translator may translate both form and meaning. The subtitle translator may also choose to display a note in the subtitles, usually in parentheses ("(" and ")"), or as a separate block of on-screen text—this allows the subtitle translator to preserve form and achieve an acceptable reading speed; that is, the subtitle translator may leave a note on the screen, even after the character has finished speaking, to both preserve form and facilitate understanding. For example, Japanese has multiple first-person pronouns (see Japanese pronouns) and each pronoun is associated with a different degree of politeness. In order to compensate during the English translation process, the subtitle translator may reformulate the sentence, add appropriate words or use notes.

=== Reasons for not subtitling a foreign language ===
Most times a foreign language is spoken in film, subtitles are used to translate the dialogue for the viewer. However, there are occasions when foreign dialogue is left unsubtitled (and thus incomprehensible to most of the target audience). This is often done if the movie is seen predominantly from the viewpoint of a particular character who does not speak the language. Such absence of subtitles allows the audience to feel a similar sense of incomprehension and alienation that the character feels. An example of this is seen in Not Without My Daughter. The Persian dialogue spoken by the Iranian characters is not subtitled because the main character Betty Mahmoody does not speak Persian and the audience is seeing the film from her viewpoint.

A variation of this was used in the video game Max Payne 3. Subtitles are used on English and Portuguese dialogues, but the latter is left untranslated as the main character does not understand the language.

=== Subtitling ===
==== Real-time ====
Real-time translation subtitling usually involves an interpreter and a stenographer working concurrently, whereby the former quickly translates the dialogue while the latter types; this form of subtitling is rare. The unavoidable delay, typing errors, lack of editing, and high cost mean that real-time translation subtitling is in low demand. Allowing the interpreter to directly speak to the viewers is usually both cheaper and quicker; however, the translation is not accessible to people who are deaf and hard-of-hearing.

==== Offline ====
Some subtitlers purposely provide edited subtitles or captions to match the needs of their audience, for learners of the spoken dialogue as a second or foreign language, visual learners, beginning readers who are deaf or hard of hearing and for people with learning or mental disabilities. For example, for many of its films and television programs, PBS displays standard captions representing speech from the program audio, word-for-word, if the viewer selects "CC1" by using the television remote control or on-screen menu; however, they also provide edited captions to present simplified sentences at a slower rate, if the viewer selects "CC2". Programs with a diverse audience also often have captions in another language. This is common with popular Latin American soap operas in Spanish. Since CC1 and CC2 share bandwidth, the U.S. Federal Communications Commission (FCC) recommends translation subtitles be placed in CC3. CC4, which shares bandwidth with CC3, is also available, but programs seldom use it.

=== Subtitles vs. dubbing and lectoring ===
The two alternative methods of 'translating' films in a foreign language are dubbing, in which other actors record over the voices of the original actors in a different language, and lectoring, a form of voice-over for fictional material where a narrator tells the audience what the actors are saying while their voices can be heard in the background. Lectoring is common for television in Russia, Poland, and a few other East European countries, while cinemas in these countries commonly show films dubbed or subtitled.

The preference for dubbing or subtitling in various countries is largely based on decisions made in the late 1920s and early 1930s. With the arrival of sound film, the film importers in Germany, Italy, France, Switzerland, Austria, San Marino, Liechtenstein, Monaco, Slovakia, Hungary, Belarus, Andorra, Spain, Canada, New Zealand, Ireland, United States and United Kingdom decided to dub the foreign voices, while the rest of Europe elected to display the dialogue as translated subtitles. The choice was largely due to financial reasons (subtitling is more economical and quicker than dubbing), but during the 1930s it also became a political preference in Germany, Italy and Spain; an expedient form of censorship that ensured that foreign views and ideas could be stopped from reaching the local audience, as dubbing makes it possible to create a dialogue which is totally different from the original. In larger German cities a few "special cinemas" use subtitling instead of dubbing.

Dubbing is still the norm and favored form in these four countries, but the proportion of subtitling is slowly growing, mainly to save cost and turnaround-time, but also due to a growing acceptance among younger generations, who are better readers and increasingly have a basic knowledge of English (the dominant language in film and TV) and thus prefer to hear the original dialogue.

Nevertheless, in Spain, for example, only public TV channels show subtitled foreign films, usually at late night. It is extremely rare that any Spanish TV channel shows subtitled versions of TV programs, series or documentaries. With the advent of digital land broadcast TV, it has become common practice in Spain to provide optional audio and subtitle streams that allow watching dubbed programs with the original audio and subtitles. In addition, only a small proportion of cinemas show subtitled films. Films with dialogue in Galician, Catalan or Basque are always dubbed, not subtitled, when they are shown in the rest of the country. Some non-Spanish-speaking TV stations subtitle interviews in Spanish; others do not.

In many Latin American countries, local network television will show dubbed versions of English-language programs and movies, while cable stations (often international) more commonly broadcast subtitled material. Preference for subtitles or dubbing varies according to individual taste and reading ability, and theaters may order two prints of the most popular films, allowing moviegoers to choose between dubbing or subtitles. Animation and children's programming, however, is nearly universally dubbed, as in other regions.

Since the introduction of the DVD and, later, the Blu-ray Disc, some high budget films include the simultaneous option of both subtitles and dubbing. Often in such cases, the translations are made separately, rather than the subtitles being a verbatim transcript of the dubbed scenes of the film. While this allows for the smoothest possible flow of the subtitles, it can be frustrating for someone attempting to learn a foreign language.

In the traditional subtitling countries, dubbing is generally regarded as something strange and unnatural and is only used for animated films and TV programs intended for pre-school children. As animated films are "dubbed" even in their original language and ambient noise and effects are usually recorded on a separate sound track, dubbing a low quality production into a second language produces little or no noticeable effect on the viewing experience. In dubbed live-action television or film, however, viewers are often distracted by the fact that the audio does not match the actors' lip movements. Furthermore, the dubbed voices may seem detached, inappropriate for the character, or overly expressive, and some ambient sounds may not be transferred to the dubbed track, creating a less enjoyable viewing experience.

=== Subtitling as a practice ===
Countries using dubs only for children's media, and subtitles otherwise. Mixed areas: Countries primarily using subtitles but occasionally full-cast dubs instead. Voice-over: Countries using usually one or just a couple of voice actors while the original soundtrack persists. General dubbing: Countries using full-cast dubs. Belgium: The Dutch-speaking region primarily uses subtitles, but sometimes imports dubs from the Netherlands or produces their own dialect dubs for children's films. The French-speaking region uses full-cast dubs for all films. Slovakia and Belarus: Countries with a separate official language that occasionally produce their own dubs, but generally use dubs from other countries, since their languages share a high degree of mutual intelligibility.

In several countries or regions nearly all foreign language TV programs are subtitled, instead of dubbed, such as:

- Albania (almost all foreign-language shows are subtitled in Albanian, children's movies and TV shows are dubbed, mostly animated)
- Argentina (cable and satellite TV and cinemas)
- Armenia (subtitles in Armenian, children's shows principally are dubbed)
- Arab Middle East and North Africa – Modern Standard Arabic-language subtitling, used for foreign programming and cinema and often used when Arabic dialects are the primary medium of a film or TV program. Countries such as Lebanon, Algeria, and Morocco also often include French subtitling simultaneously.
- Australia (especially by SBS)
- Azerbaijan (subtitles in Azeri, children's shows principally are dubbed)
- Bangladesh (subtitles in Bengali)
- Barbados (TV subtitles in English or captions depends on the specific program)
- Belgium (subtitles in Dutch, included French, German and Italian from TV and cinemas.)
- Belarus (Belarusian subtitles are used in foreign films and television programs except for children's media)
- Belize (cable and satellite TV and cinemas)
- Bhutan (subtitles in Dzongkha)
- Bolivia (cable and satellite TV and cinemas)
- Bosnia and Herzegovina (Children's shows are dubbed in Serbian, Croatian or Bosnian, everything else subtitled in Bosnian)
- Brazil (some cinemas and cable channels use Portuguese subtitles)
- Brunei (subtitles in Malay for programming and movies in English and vernacular languages such as Chinese)
- Bulgaria (subtitles in Bulgarian)
- Cambodia (subtitles in Khmer)
- Cape Verde (subtitles in Portuguese)
- Chile (cable and satellite TV and cinemas)
- China (Most Chinese language programming includes subtitles in Chinese, since many languages and dialects are spoken by the populace, but the writing system is fairly independent of dialects)
- Colombia (cable and satellite TV and cinemas)
- Costa Rica (cable and satellite TV and cinemas)
- Croatia (Children's shows are dubbed in Croatian, everything else is subtitled in Croatian. Subtitling mutually intelligible Serbian, Bosnian and Montenegrin-language content is typically disapproved by Croatian government bodies, with the independent regulatory Council for Electronic Media using laws that oblige media services to air foreign-language programmes with translations into Croatian to warn and threaten to revoke operating licenses to television operators who refuse to adhere to it; rare instances of such subtitling usually end up being ridiculed by the public)
- Cuba (cable and satellite TV and cinemas)
- Curaçao (subtitles in Dutch)
- Cyprus (subtitles in Greek and Turkish)
- Denmark (subtitles in Danish. Television programming directed toward children and family-friendly films are dubbed, although cinemas often offer subtitled late-evening screenings of the latter. The off-screen narration in documentaries may be dubbed, although on-screen dialogue is always subtitled)
- Dominican Republic (satellite TV and cable and cinemas)
- Ecuador (cable and satellite TV and cinemas)
- El Salvador (cable and satellite TV and cinemas)
- Estonia (Estonian language subtitles are used in foreign films and television programs except for children's media)
- Fiji (subtitles from Hindi into English)
- Finland (subtitles in Finnish or Swedish, Finland is bilingual; in TV children's programs are dubbed and off-screen narration in documentaries is often dubbed)
- Georgia (subtitles in Georgian, children's shows principally are dubbed)
- Greece (only children's shows are dubbed and films are subtitled)
- Guatemala (cable and satellite TV and cinemas)
- Guyana (cable and satellite TV and cinemas)
- Hong Kong (Dubbing in Cantonese often happens, but subtitling is also common, since these foreign programs are often broadcast in multiple languages)
- Honduras (cable and satellite TV and cinemas)
- Iceland (subtitles in Icelandic. Television programming directed toward children and family-friendly films are dubbed, although cinemas often offer subtitled late-evening screenings of the latter. The off-screen narration in documentaries may be dubbed, although on-screen dialogue is always subtitled)
- India (most English channels now give subtitles of their programs in English)
- Indonesia (subtitles in Indonesian, some foreign movies have subtitles in more than one language)
- Iran (subtitles in Persian)
- Ireland (subtitles in English for non-English programs, including those in Irish. Occasional subtitles in Irish for programs shown on the Irish language channel: TG4)
- Israel (non-Hebrew television programs and films are always translated into Hebrew with subtitles. Bilingual Hebrew-Arabic or Hebrew-Russian subtitling, showing translation into both languages simultaneously, is common on public TV channels. Dubbing is restricted to programs and films aimed at children below school age. As of 2008 the closed captioning industry in Israel is on the rise since a law has been approved, stating that all Hebrew programs in Israeli channels must be subtitled for the hearing impaired. Moreover, in recent years it became a norm in other channels and broadcasting bodies in Israel)
- Jamaica (cable and satellite TV and cinemas)
- Japan (subtitles in Japanese).
- Kazakhstan (subtitles in Kazakh)
- Kurdistan (subtitles in Kurdish)
- Kyrgyzstan (subtitles in Kyrgyz)
- Latvia (subtitles in Latvian, occasionally in Latvian-language shows or simply in Russian-language channels in Russian)
- Laos (subtitles in Lao)
- Lithuania (all channels are subtitles and cinemas, children shows are dubbed)
- Luxembourg (subtitles in Luxembourgish)
- Macau (subtitles in Cantonese)
- Malaysia (subtitles in "Malay(sian)" for programming in English and vernacular languages such as Chinese and Tamil and foreign languages such as Hindi and Korean except certain programs dubbed into Malay such as anime, news programs in respective vernacular languages (news reports in vernacular language news programs with foreign people speaking are translated in subtitles) and certain Malay-language live action programs subtitled in English. Also appearing for certain Indonesian programming excluding live, current affairs and news programming since 2006. (Note: Indonesian has a diglossic situation: newscasters and public officials from the country use a "high" or formal variety which is relatively intelligible to Malaysians, popular media like soap operas (sinetron) however use a "low" Betawified informal register which have lesser degrees of intelligibility.) All movies on 35 mm film subtitled in Malaysian and Simplified Chinese. Usually, animation and 3D movies are exempted from subtitling (though studios may choose to add subtitles at their discretion). Indian and Chinese movies usually have subtitles of more than one languages)
- Maldives (subtitles in Dhivehi)
- Malta (subtitles in Maltese)
- Mexico (cable and satellite TV and cinemas)
- Mongolia (subtitles in Mongolian)
- Montenegro (subtitles in Montenegrin, children's shows dubbed in Serbian; Serbian subtitles imported frequently)
- Moldova (all Romanian subtitles and children are dubbed)
- Myanmar (subtitles in Burmese, typically in Non-Burmese children's programming and anime, dubbing rarely used)
- Nepal (subtitles in Nepali)
- Netherlands (subtitles in Dutch, children's shows are dubbed)
- New Zealand (subtitles in both Māori and English especially Māori Television)
- Nicaragua (cable and satellite TV and cinemas)
- North Macedonia (Children's programs dubbed in Macedonian or Serbian, everything else subtitled in Macedonian)
- Norway (subtitles in Norwegian. Television programming directed toward children and family-friendly films are dubbed, although cinemas often offer subtitled late-evening screenings of the latter. The off-screen narration in documentaries may be dubbed, although on-screen dialogue is always subtitled)
- Pakistan (subtitles in Urdu)
- Panama (cable and satellite TV and cinemas)
- Papua New Guinea (cable and satellite TV and cinemas)
- Paraguay (cable and satellite TV and cinemas)
- Peru (in Aymara and Quechua)
- Philippines (some Filipino films were all subtitled in English, but all foreign television programs were dubbed in Filipino.)
- Poland (almost all live-action movies in cinemas are subtitled; some movies can be found in two versions, with subtitles and dubbing)
- Portugal (most shows are subtitled in Portuguese, but children's shows and documentaries are usually dubbed)
- Romania (subtitles in Romanian for most shows, except children's programs, which started to be dubbed)
- Serbia (all children's shows and teleshopping are dubbed, everything else is subtitled in Serbian)
- Slovenia (children's shows are dubbed, everything else is subtitled in Slovenian)
- Singapore in English, Chinese, Tamil and Malay, with some subtitling bilingual in either Chinese and English or Tamil and Malay
- South Africa (from Afrikaans, Sesotho, Xhosa, Zulu into English)
- South Korea (subtitles in Korean)
- Sri Lanka (subtitles in Sinhala and Tamil)
- Suriname (subtitles in Dutch)
- Sweden (subtitles in Swedish. Television programming directed toward children and family-friendly films are dubbed, although cinemas often offer subtitled late-evening screenings of the latter. The off-screen narration in documentaries, although on-screen dialogue is always subtitled)
- Thailand (subtitles in Thai)
- The Bahamas (cable and satellite TV and cinemas)
- Taiwan (Mandarin subtitles appear on most shows and all news or live action broadcasts)
- Tajikistan (subtitles in Tajik)
- Trinidad and Tobago (cable and satellite TV and cinemas)
- Turkey (subtitles in Turkish)
- Turkmenistan (subtitles in Turkmen)
- United Kingdom (subtitles for open captioning and closed captioning in every DVDs; occasionally including Scottish & Welsh subtitles)
- United States (subtitles in cc1, cc2, cc3, cc4 in every DVDs)
- Uruguay (cable and satellite TV and cinemas)
- Uzbekistan (subtitles in Uzbek)
- Venezuela (cable and satellite TV and cinemas)
- Vietnam (subtitles in Vietnamese)

It is also common that television services in minority languages subtitle their programs in the dominant language as well. Examples include the Welsh S4C and Irish TG4 who subtitle in English and the Swedish Yle Fem in Finland who subtitle in the majority language Finnish.

In Wallonia (Belgium) films are usually dubbed, but sometimes they are played on two channels at the same time: one dubbed (on La Une) and the other subtitled (on La Deux), but this is no longer done as frequently due to low ratings.

In Australia, one FTA network, SBS airs its foreign-language shows subtitled in English.

== Categories ==
Subtitles in the same language on the same production can be in different categories:

- Hearing impaired subtitles (sometimes abbreviated as HI or SDH) are intended for people who are hearing impaired, providing information about music, environmental sounds and off-screen speakers (e.g. when a doorbell rings or a gunshot is heard). In other words, they indicate the kinds and the sources of the sounds coming from the movie, and usually put this information inside brackets to demarcate it from actors' dialogues. For example: [sound of typing on a keyboard], [mysterious music], [glass breaks], [woman screaming], [children screaming], [children giggling], [bell], [geese honking], [sirens] and [shrieks].
- Narrative is the most common type of subtitle in which spoken dialogue is displayed. These are most commonly used to translate a film with one spoken language and the text of a second language.
- Forced subtitles are common on movies and only provide subtitles when the characters speak a foreign or alien language, or a sign, flag, or other text in a scene is not translated in the localization and dubbing process. In some cases, foreign dialogue may be left untranslated if the movie is meant to be seen from the point of view of a particular character who does not speak the language in question. For example, in Steven Spielberg's Amistad the dialogue of the Spanish slave traders is subtitled, while African languages are left untranslated.
- Content subtitles are a North American Secondary Industry (non-Hollywood, often low-budget) staple. They add content dictation that is missing from filmed action or dialogue. Due to the general low-budget allowances in such films, it is often more feasible to add the overlay subtitles to fill in information. They are most commonly seen on America's Maverick films as forced subtitles, and on Canada's MapleLeaf films as optional subtitles. Content subtitles also appear in the beginning of some higher-budget films (e.g., Star Wars) or at the end of a film (e.g., Gods and Generals).
- Titles only are typically used by dubbed programs and provide only the text for any untranslated on-screen text. They are most commonly forced (see above).
- Bonus subtitles are an additional set of text blurbs that are added to DVDs. They are similar to Blu-ray Discs' in-movie content or to the "info nuggets" in VH1 Pop-up Video. Often shown in popup or balloon form, they point out background, behind-the-scenes information relative to what is appearing on screen, often indicating filming and performance mistakes in continuity or consistency.
- Localized subtitles are a separate subtitle track that uses expanded references (i.e., "The sake [a Japanese Wine] was excellent as was the Wasabi") or can replace the standardized subtitle track with a localized form replacing references to local custom (i.e., from above, "The wine was excellent as was the spicy dip").
- Extended or expanded subtitles combine the standard subtitle track with the localization subtitle track. Originally found only on Celestial DVDs in the early 2000s, the format has expanded to many export-intended releases from China, Japan, India, and Taiwan. The term "Expanded Subtitles" is owned by Celestial, with "Extended Subtitles" being used by other companies.

== Types ==
Subtitles exist in two forms; open subtitles are open to all and cannot be turned off by the viewer; closed subtitles are designed for a certain group of viewers, and can usually be turned on or off or selected by the viewer – examples being teletext pages, U.S. Closed captions (608/708), DVB Bitmap subtitles, DVD or Blu-ray subtitles.

While distributing content, subtitles can appear in one of three types:

- Hard (also known as hardsubs or open subtitles). The subtitle text is irreversibly merged in original video frames, and so no special equipment or software is required for playback. Hence, complex transition effects and animation can be implemented, such as karaoke song lyrics using various colors, fonts, sizes, animation (like a bouncing ball) etc. to follow the lyrics. However, these subtitles cannot be turned off unless the original video is also included in the distribution as they are now part of the original frame, and thus it is impossible to have several variants of subtitling, such as in multiple languages.
- Prerendered (also known as closed) subtitles are separate video frames that are overlaid on the original video stream while playing. Prerendered subtitles are used on DVD and Blu-ray (though they are contained in the same file as the video stream). It is possible to turn them off or have multiple language subtitles and switch among them, but the player has to support such subtitles to display them. Also, subtitles are usually encoded as images with minimal bitrate and number of colors; they usually lack anti-aliased font rasterization. Also, changing such subtitles is hard, but special OCR software, such as SubRip exists to convert such subtitles to "soft" ones.
- Soft (also known as softsubs or closed subtitles) are, like closed captions, separate instructions, usually a specially marked up text with time stamps to be optionally displayed during playback. It requires player support and, moreover, there are multiple incompatible (but usually reciprocally convertible) subtitle file formats, but enables greater versatility in post production. Softsubs are relatively easy to create and change, and thus are frequently used for fansubs. Text rendering quality can vary depending on the player, but is generally higher than prerendered subtitles. Also, some formats introduce text encoding troubles for the end-user, especially if different languages are used simultaneously (for example, Latin and Asian scripts). A subtitle track with time stamp also allows for accurate time keeping after having paused the video recording, which would otherwise cause discrepancy between the duration of the video recording since the usually memorized clock time at start and real clock time. Camcorders may record additional metadata such as technical parameters (aperture, exposure value, exposure duration, photosensitivity, etc.).

In other categorization, digital video subtitles are sometimes called internal, if they are embedded in a single video file container along with video and audio streams, and external if they are distributed as separate file (that is less convenient, but it is easier to edit or change such file).

Comparison table
Feature	Hard	Prerendered	Soft
Can be turned off or on	No	Yes	Yes
Multiple subtitle variants (for example, languages)	Yes, though all displayed at the same time	Yes	Yes
Editable	No	Difficult, but possible	Yes
Player requirements	None	Majority of players support DVD subtitles	Usually requires installation of special software, unless national regulators mandate its distribution
Visual appearance, colors, font quality	Low to high, depending on video resolution and compression	Low	Low to high, depending on player and subtitle file format
Transitions, karaoke and other special effects	Highest	Low	Depends on player and subtitle file format, but generally poor
Distribution	Inside original video	Separate low-bitrate video stream, commonly multiplexed	Relatively small subtitle file or instructions stream, multiplexed or separate
Additional overhead	None, though subtitles added by re-encoding of the original video may degrade overall image quality, and the sharp edges of text may introduce artifacts in surrounding video	High	Low

== Subtitle formats ==
=== For software video players ===
Sortable table
Name	Extension	Type	Text styling	Metadata	Timings	Timing precision
AQTitle	.aqt	Text	Yes	Yes	Framings	As frames
EBU-TT-D	—N/a	XML	Yes	Yes	Elapsed time	Unlimited
Gloss Subtitle	.gsub	HTML, XML	Yes	Yes	Elapsed time	10 milliseconds
JACOSub	.jss	Text with markup	Yes	No	Elapsed time	As frames
MicroDVD	.sub	Text	No	No	Framings	As frames
MPEG-4 Timed Text	.ttxt (or mixed with audio-video stream)	XML	Yes	No	Elapsed time	1 millisecond
MPSub	.sub	Text	No	Yes	Sequential time	10 milliseconds
Ogg Writ	—N/a (embedded in Ogg container)	Text	Yes	Yes	Sequential granules	Dependent on bitstream
Phoenix Subtitle	.pjs	Text	No	No	Framings	As frames
PowerDivX	.psb	Text	No	No	Elapsed time	1 second
RealText	.rt	HTML	Yes	No	Elapsed time	10 milliseconds
SAMI	.smi	HTML	Yes	Yes	Framings	As frames
Spruce subtitle format	.stl	Text	Yes	Yes	Sequential time+frames	Sequential time+frames
Structured Subtitle Format	.ssf	XML	Yes	Yes	Elapsed time	1 millisecond
SubRip	.srt	Text	Yes	No	Elapsed time	1 millisecond
(Advanced) Sub Station Alpha	.ssa or .ass (advanced)	Text	Yes	Yes	Elapsed time	10 milliseconds
SubViewer	.sub or .sbv	Text	No	Yes	Elapsed time	10 milliseconds
Universal Subtitle Format	.usf	XML	Yes	Yes	Elapsed time	1 millisecond
VobSub	.sub + .idx	Image	—N/a	—N/a	Elapsed time	1 millisecond
WebVTT	.vtt	Text, HTML	Yes	Yes	Elapsed time	1 millisecond
XSUB	—N/a (embedded in .divx container)	Image	—N/a	—N/a	Elapsed time	1 millisecond

There are still many more uncommon formats. Most of them are text-based and have the extension .txt.

=== For media ===
For cinema movies shown in a theatre:

- Cinema
- D-Cinema: digital projection of movie in DCP format

For movies on DVD Video:

- DVD-Video subtitles (related to VobSub)
- Blu-ray Disc subtitles (related to PGS)

For TV broadcast:

- Teletext
- DVB Subtitles (DVB-SUB), a graphic-based, bitmap format.
- Philips Overlay Graphics Text
- Imitext

Subtitles created for TV broadcast are stored in a variety of file formats. The majority of these formats are proprietary to the vendors of subtitle insertion systems.

Broadcast subtitle formats include: .ESY, .XIF, .X32, .PAC, .RAC, .CHK, .AYA, .890, .CIP, .CAP, .ULT, .USF, .CIN, .L32, .ST4, .ST7, .TIT, .STL

The EBU format defined by Technical Reference 3264-E is an 'open' format intended for subtitle exchange between broadcasters. Files in this format have the extension .stl (not to be mixed up with text "Spruce subtitle format" mentioned above, which also has extension .stl)

For internet delivery:

- SMIL
- TTML/DFXP
  - SMPTE-TT/CFF-TT (for UltraViolet-compatible players)
  - EBU-TT-D

The Timed Text format currently a "Candidate Recommendation" of the W3C (called DFXP) is also proposed as an 'open' format for subtitle exchange and distribution to media players, such as Microsoft Silverlight.

== See also ==
- Airscript
- Camtasia
- Closed captioning
- ColorSounds
- Comparison of subtitle editors
- Comparison of software video players with subtitle support
- Cue card
- Danmaku subtitling
- Dubbing
- Interactive transcripts
- Intertitle
- Karaoke
- Souffleur
- Subtitle editor
- Surtitles
- Synchronized Multimedia Integration Language
- Telop
- Time shifting
- Transcription (linguistics)
- WYSIWYG
