= Amara (organization) =

Captioning website

- Website type: Localization management and crowdsourcing
- Available in: English
- Owners: nonprofit, 501(c)(3) organization
- Website: amara.org/en/
- Current status: active

Amara, formerly known as Universal Subtitles, is a web-based non-profit project created by the Participatory Culture Foundation that hosts and allows user-subtitled video to be accessed and created. Users upload video through many major video hosting websites such as YouTube, Vimeo, and Ustream to subtitle.

It uses crowdsourcing techniques to subtitle video as well as having a paid service for professionally created subtitles. Users of the project and service include Mozilla, PBS, Khan Academy, Netflix, Twitter, Coursera, Udacity, and Google. Most companies listed have "teams" organized by Amara on the website that focus on translation and caption of videos. Amara claims that it lowers the cost of captioning and translation by at least 95 percent because of their volunteer-based system.

The software for the Amara platform was previously open source software under the GNU Affero General Public License. In January 2020, Amara announced that the platform would become proprietary and closed source, citing that it wanted to have more control over how it is deployed and used, and protect its work from being used by for-profit companies in means that are "inconsistent with its values".

== Grant ==
The MacArthur Foundation issued a grant of $100,000 to the Participatory Culture Foundation in December 2010 specifically to support Amara, referencing looking to assist producers of online documentaries and other video creators in both translating and subtitling their productions. Mozilla and the Knight Foundation invested a total of 1 million dollars into the project in 2011, citing support of global translations and the open web. Mozilla awarded a grant of $100,000 in 2011, while the Knight Foundation provided $250,000 in 2012. Amara first hosted a "Translation Party" with PBS NewsHour in order to attempt to translate an interview into as many languages as possible on December 23, 2010, then gained a partnership with PBS NewsHour in 2012 with a focus on translating videos to languages other than English. Amara has been utilized by educational web start-ups Khan Academy and Coursera in order to allow for subtitles on public educational videos, with Coursera CEO stating that it was important to making accessible content to learners who did not have English as a first language.

In 2013, Amara released a feature that allowed users to connect their YouTube accounts to Amara and create subtitles for free that would show on both platforms. The website released an improved subtitling platform with this feature.

On March 27, 2026, Amara announced the closure of its Public Workspace platform, which resulted in the deletion of thousands of user-generated subtitles if they weren't transferred to a private team account. The closure occurred on April 30, 2026, but users were allowed to download and view previously-transcribed videos until May 15.

== Name change ==
Amara announced an official name transition from Universal Subtitles on April 5, 2012. The announcement cited the growth of the platform and increased potential to branch out of subtitling by using a less specific name. The name was chosen for several unspecified associations, but the announcement mentions the Spanish verb amar (to love) and that the word in Sanskrit means eternal.

== Partnership ==
Taghreedat and Amara announced a partnership on August 30, 2013, in order to expand Arabic outreach through collaboration and increasing accessibility. The Amara interface was translated and integrated completely in Arabic as a result. On December 14, 2013, Amazon Smile listed Amara as one of its options for donation.

== Educational platform ==
Ensemble Video, a multi-focused video company, partnered and integrated their service with Amara's subtitling editor on October 27, 2015, being the first higher-education educational platform to do so. On October 17, 2014, Amara launched a new homepage design, and on April 7, 2015, Amara switched its platform to a new API.

== Awards ==
Amara received a Tech Award in 2011 in the Equality category. The FCC presented the Advancement in Accessibility Award to Amara on October 28, 2011. It received the ninth Intercultural Innovation Award, a combined effort from the United Nations Alliance of Civilizations and the BMW Group, in 2011 for "bridging the gap" between languages.

== See also ==
- Comparison of subtitle editors
- OpenSubtitles
