= WebVTT =

File format

- Filename extension: .vtt
- Internet media type: text/vtt
- Developed by: World Wide Web Consortium (W3C)
- Initial release: 10 August 2010; 15 years ago
- Latest release: 4 April 2019; 7 years ago
- Type of format: Timed text
- Extended from: SRT
- Standard: W3C WebVTT
- Open format?: Yes
- Free format?: Yes

WebVTT (Web Video Text Tracks) is a World Wide Web Consortium (W3C) standard for displaying timed text in connection with the HTML5 <track> element.

The early drafts of its specification were written by the WHATWG in 2010 after discussions about what caption format should be supported by HTML5—the main options being the relatively mature, XML-based Timed Text Markup Language (TTML) or an entirely new but more lightweight standard based on the widely used SubRip format. The final decision was for the new standard, initially called WebSRT (Web Subtitle Resource Tracks). It shared the .srt file extension and was broadly based on the SubRip format, though not fully compatible with it. The prospective format was later renamed WebVTT. In the January 13, 2011, version of the HTML5 Draft Report, the <track> element was introduced and the specification was updated to document WebVTT cue text rendering rules. The WebVTT specification is a W3C Candidate Recommendation, and the basic features are supported by all major browsers.

== Main differences from SubRip ==
- WebVTT's first line starts with WEBVTT after the optional UTF-8 byte order mark
- There is space for optional header data between the first line and the first cue
- Timecode fractional values are separated by a full stop instead of a comma
- Timecode hours are optional
- The frame numbering/identification preceding the timecode is optional
- Comments identified by the word NOTE can be added
- Metadata information can be added in a JSON-style format
- Chapter information can be optionally specified
- Only supports extended characters as UTF-8
- CSS in a separate file defined in the companion HTML document for C tags is used instead of the FONT element
- Cue settings allow the customization of cue positioning on the video

== Compatibility ==
Browser Support
Browser	Cue Text Tags	Cue Positioning	CSS Styling
Chrome	35+		
Android stock browser	5.0+		
Opera	22+		
Safari	7+ (iOS: 8+)		
Firefox	31+ (Android: 32+)		—N/a
Microsoft Edge	12+	—N/a	
Internet Explorer	10+	—N/a	

Firefox implemented WebVTT in its nightly builds (Firefox 24), but initially it was not enabled by default. The feature had to be enabled in Firefox by going to the "about:config" page and setting the value of "media.webvtt.enabled" to true. YouTube began supporting WebVTT in April, 2013. As of July 24, 2014, Mozilla has enabled WebVTT on Firefox by default.

Subtitles in a .vtt file show online, but not when stored on a local drive.

== Example of WebVTT format ==
A sample file from the W3C captioning Roger Bingham interviewing Neil deGrasse Tyson ():

WEBVTT

00:11.000 --> 00:13.000
<v Roger Bingham>We are in New York City

00:13.000 --> 00:16.000
<v Roger Bingham>We're actually at the Lucern Hotel, just down the street

00:16.000 --> 00:18.000
<v Roger Bingham>from the American Museum of Natural History

00:18.000 --> 00:20.000
<v Roger Bingham>And with me is Neil deGrasse Tyson

00:20.000 --> 00:22.000
<v Roger Bingham>Astrophysicist, Director of the Hayden Planetarium

00:22.000 --> 00:24.000
<v Roger Bingham>at the AMNH.

00:24.000 --> 00:26.000
<v Roger Bingham>Thank you for walking down here.

00:27.000 --> 00:30.000
<v Roger Bingham>And I want to do a follow-up on the last conversation we did.

00:30.000 --> 00:31.500 align:right size:50%
<v Roger Bingham>When we e-mailed—

00:30.500 --> 00:32.500 align:left size:50%
<v Neil deGrasse Tyson>Didn't we talk about enough in that conversation?

00:32.000 --> 00:35.500 align:right size:50%
<v Roger Bingham>No! No no no no; 'cos 'cos obviously 'cos

00:32.500 --> 00:33.500 align:left size:50%
<v Neil deGrasse Tyson><i>Laughs</i>

00:35.500 --> 00:38.000
<v Roger Bingham>You know I'm so excited my glasses are falling off here.

== Other features ==
In June 2013, an example was added to the specification that included a new "region" setting. This feature is supported since Firefox 59 and Safari 14.1 (14.5 on iOS) but not in any other browser.
