= SubRip =

Program that extracts subtitles from video

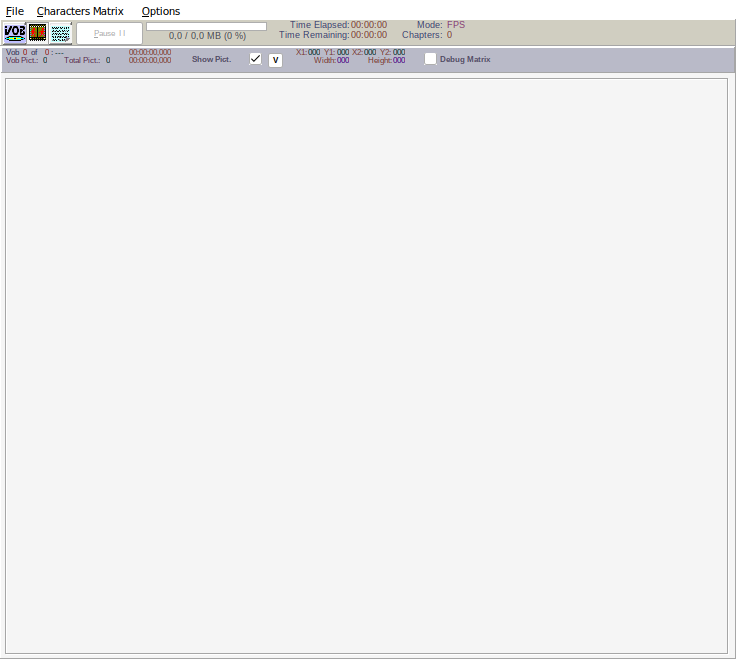
- Developers: Brain, T.V. Zuggy, mrSHADOW, Yakov, ai4spam, Bloody, Roy Damman,
- Release: 3 March 2000; 26 years ago
- Stable release: 1.57.1 / November 14, 2018
- Written in: Delphi
- Operating system: Microsoft Windows
- Available in: English
- Type: Subtitle editor
- License: GPL
- Website: zuggy.wz.cz

SubRip Text (file format)
- Filename extension: .srt
- Internet media type: application/x-subrip (Note: Android 10 value. Not IANA-approved and in fact invalid due to "x-" no longer being unregulated.)
- Developed by: Brain, Zuggy
- Type of format: Timed text
- Container for: Subtitles and their order and timings
- Extended to: WebVTT
- Open format?: Yes
- Free format?: Yes

SubRip is a free software program for Microsoft Windows which extracts subtitles and their timings from various video formats to a text file. It is released under the GNU GPL. Its subtitle format's file extension is .srt and is widely supported. Each .srt file is a human-readable file format where the subtitles are stored sequentially along with the timing information. Most subtitles distributed on the Internet are in this format.

== Software ==
Using optical character recognition, SubRip can extract from live video, video files and DVDs, then record the extracted subtitles and timings as a Subrip format text file. It can optionally save the recognized subtitles as bitmaps for later subtraction (erasure) from the source video.

In practice, SubRip is configured with the correct codec for the video source, then trained by the user on the specific text area, fonts, styles, colors and video processing requirements to recognize subtitles. After trial and fine tuning, SubRip can automatically extract subtitles for the whole video source file during its playback. SubRip records the beginning and end times and text for each subtitle in the output text .srt file.

SubRip uses AviSynth to extract video frames from source video, and can rip subtitles from all video files supported by that program.

== Format ==
The SubRip file format is described on the Matroska multimedia container format website as "perhaps the most basic of all subtitle formats." SubRip (SubRip Text) files are named with the extension .srt, and contain formatted lines of plain text in groups separated by a blank line. Subtitles are numbered sequentially, starting at 1. The timecode format used is hours:minutes:seconds,milliseconds with time units fixed to two zero-padded digits and fractions fixed to three zero-padded digits (00:00:00,000). The comma (,) is used for the decimal separator between seconds and milliseconds.

1. A numeric counter identifying each sequential subtitle
2. The time that the subtitle should appear on the screen, followed by --> and the time it should disappear
3. Subtitle text itself on one or more lines
4. A blank line containing no text, indicating the end of this subtitle

Example for Star Wars: Episode II – Attack of the Clones:

1
00:02:16,612 --> 00:02:19,376
Senator, we're making
our final approach into Coruscant.

2
00:02:19,482 --> 00:02:21,609
Very good, Lieutenant.

3
00:03:13,336 --> 00:03:15,167
We made it.

4
00:03:18,608 --> 00:03:20,371
I guess I was wrong.

5
00:03:20,476 --> 00:03:22,671
There was no danger at all.

=== Markup ===
Unofficially the format has very basic text formatting, which can be either interpreted or passed through for rendering depending on the processing application. Formatting is derived from HTML tags for bold, italic, underline and color:

- Bold – <b>…</b>
- Italic – <i>…</i>
- Underline – <u>…</u>
- Font color – <font color="color name or #code">…</font>

Tags can be nested to combine multiple styles within a line. However, some implementations do not interpret tag positions in detail and instead apply the style of the first tag that appears in the line to the entire line, effectively treating it as a single-style segment.

Also unofficially, text coordinates can be specified at the end of the timestamp line as X1:… X2:… Y1:… Y2:….

== Compatibility ==
The SubRip .srt file format is supported by most software video players. For Windows software video players that do not support subtitle playback directly, the VSFilter DirectX filter displays SubRip and other subtitle formats. The SubRip format is supported directly by many subtitle creation and editing tools, as well as some hardware home media players. In August 2008, YouTube added subtitle support to its Flash video player under the "Closed Captioning" option – content producers can upload subtitles in SubRip format.

=== Text encoding ===
SubRip's default output encoding is configured as Windows-1252. However, output options are also given for many Windows code pages as well Unicode encodings, such as UTF-8 and UTF-16, with or without byte order mark (BOM). Therefore, there is no official character encoding standard for .srt files, which means that any SubRip file parser must attempt to use Charset detection. Unicode BOMs are typically used to aid detection.

YouTube only supports UTF-8. The default encoding for subtitle files in FFmpeg is UTF-8. All text in a Matroska™ file is encoded in UTF-8. This means that mkvmerge has to convert every text file it reads as well as every text given on the command line from one character set into UTF-8.

== SubViewer ==
In 1999, Brain created SubRip, and a friend, David Dolinski, created SubViewer, who offered it for download on his personal website.

SubViewer was included in the DivX media player. On August 28, 2008, YouTube included support for SubViewer and SubRip, allowing existing videos to be retroactively subtitled.

== WebVTT ==
A format originally called WebSRT (Web Subtitle Resource Tracks) was specified in 2010 by the Web Hypertext Application Technology Working Group for the proposed HTML5 <track> element. It shared the .srt file extension and was based on parts of the SubRip format, but was not fully compatible with it. The prospective format was later renamed WebVTT (Web Video Text Track). Google's Chrome and Microsoft's Internet Explorer 10 browsers were the first to support <track> tags with WebVTT files for HTML5 videos. Mozilla Firefox implemented WebVTT in its nightly builds (Firefox 24), and as of Firefox 31 (July 24, 2014), Mozilla enabled WebVTT on Firefox by default. YouTube began supporting WebVTT in April, 2013.

== See also ==
- Closed captioning
- Timed text
- Comparison of video player software § Subtitle ability
- Avidemux
- List of free television software
- MicroDVD
- SubStation Alpha
- Universal Subtitle Format
- DirectVobSub – able to extract subtitles from a DVD without first extracting the files from it
