= GPAC Project on Advanced Content =

Open-source multimedia framework

GPAC
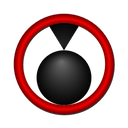
- GPAC Multimedia Open Source Project
- Developers: Jean Le Feuvre, Romain Bouqueau, Aurélien David, People@GPAC
- Release: 2003; 23 years ago
- Stable release: 26.07.0 / 24 July 2026; 45 days ago
- Written in: C
- Operating system: Cross-platform
- Available in: English
- Type: Multimedia framework
- License: LGPL v2.1
- Website: gpac.io
- Repository: github.com/gpac/gpac

GPAC Project on Advanced Content (GPAC, a recursive acronym) is an open-source multimedia framework focused on modularity and standards compliance. GPAC is best known for its wide MP4/ISOBMFF/CMAF and DASH/HLS capabilities. It is popular among video enthusiasts, academic researchers, standardization bodies, and professional broadcasters, claiming to have reached 100 millions downloads as of 2025.

GPAC provides tools to process, inspect, package, stream, playback and interact with media content. Such content can be any combination of audio, video, subtitles, metadata, encrypted media, rendering and JavaScript.

The project provides four sets of software tools based on a core library called libgpac:

- A multimedia packager, MP4Box, open-sourced in 2003
- A general pipeline engine, gpac, introduced in version 1.0 (2019)
- Side-projects made by core contributors but not part of the main repository, such as the popular mp4box.js
- An API, available from many languages and platforms used by the aforementioned tools, x264, and many others

GPAC is cross-platform. It is written in C99 for portability reasons, attempting to keep the memory footprint as low as possible. It is currently running under Windows, Linux, MacOS X, iOS, Android, and many other systems.

== History and standards ==
GPAC was founded in New York City in 1999 as a company called AviPix. In 2003, it became open-source, with the initial goal of becoming the defacto MPEG-4 Systems standard implementation, as a small and flexible alternative to the MPEG-4 reference software.

In parallel, as MPEG-4 was intended to compete with Macromedia Flash, GPAC evolved to support other standards such as X3D, W3C SVG Tiny 1.2, and OMA/3GPP/ISMA and eventually MPEG-DASH and subsequent standards (MPEG CMAF, CENC, ProRes, WebVTT, TTML, HDR, SCTE-35, ...). The MPEG-DASH feature can be used to reconstruct .mp4 files from videos streamed and cached in this format (e.g., YouTube). Various projects in the research, open-source, security, and industrial areas used or use GPAC.

Since 2013, GPAC Licensing has offered business support and commercial licenses. In 2022 Netflix announced using GPAC for their worldwide content operations including the Netflix service, studio content, and merchandising material.

== Architecture evolution and additional tools ==
In 2019 the GPAC team explained the code has undergone a re-architecture called Filters with release 0.9 while release 0.8 is the last release of the legacy architecture with an extended 18-months support. The front-end applications remained unchanged, making the transition seamless. The underlying filters build a dynamic modular dataflow pipeline which can be edited and monitored using Web GUIs.

In 2020 GPAC 1.0 was released. The Website was split into a wiki documentation, a doxygen API documentation, a buildbot and GitHub actions, a testbot with a high coverage. The new gpac application has been used as a FFmpeg on steroids offering additional speed, features, ease of use. A list of use-cases with associated command-lines was later added.

Using the new architecture, GPAC has also released new projects such as mp4box.js with 1.0 release in 2025, the Compliance Warden for standard compliance (2020), a GStreamer plugin (2025), a FFmpeg interposer called FFgpac (2026), and a just-in-time packager called Jitsu (2026).

== Multimedia content features ==
=== Packaging ===
GPAC features encoders and multiplexers, publishing and content distribution tools for MP4 files and many tools for scene descriptions (BIFS/VRML/X3D converters, SWF/BIFS, SVG/BIFS, etc.). MP4Box provides all these tools in a single command-line application. Current supported features are:

- MP4/3GP Conversion from MP3, AVI, MPEG-2 TS, MPEG-PS, AAC, H263, H264, H265, H266, AMR, and many others,
- 3GPP DIMS Packaging from SVG tiny 1.2 files,
- File layout: fragmentation or interleaving, and cleaning,
- File hinting for RTP/RTSP and QTSS/DSS servers (MPEG-4/ISMA/3GP/ 3GP2 files),
- File splitting by size or time, extraction from file and file concatenation,
- XML information dumping for MP4 and RTP hint tracks,
- Media Track extractions,
- ISMA E&A encryption and decryption,
- 3GPP timed text tools (SUB/SRT/TTXT/TeXML), VobSub import/export,
- BIFS codec and scene conversion between MP4, BT and XMT-A,
- LASeR codec and scene conversion between MP4, SAF, SVG and XSR (XML LASeR),
- XML scene statistics for BIFS scene (BT, XMT-A and MP4),
- Conversion to and from BT, XMT-A, WRL, X3D and X3DV with support for gzip.
- A syntax that ensures that simple operations, i.e. concatenating 3 files into one new one, are not simple.

=== Playing ===
GPAC supports many protocols and standards, among which:

- BIFS scenes (2D, 3D and mixed 2D/3D scenes),
- VRML 2.0 (VRML97) scenes (without GEO or NURBS extensions),
- X3D scenes (not complete) in X3D (XML) and X3DV (VRML) formats,
- SVG Tiny 1.2 scenes (including packaged in 3GP DIMS files),
- LASeR and SAF (partial) support,
- Progressive loading/rendering of SVG, X3D and XMT files,
- HTTP reading of all scene descriptions,
- gzip supported for all textual formats of MPEG4/X3D/VRML/SVG,
- MP4 and 3GPP file reading (local & http),
- MP3 and AAC files (local & http) and HTTP streaming (Shoutcast/Icecast radios),
- Most common media codecs for image, audio and video,
- Most common media containers,
- 3GPP Timed Text / MPEG-4 Streaming Text,
- MPEG-2 TS demultiplexer (local/UDP/RTP) with DVB support (Linux only),
- Streaming support through RTP/RTCP (unicast and multicast) and RTSP/SDP,
- Plugins for Mozilla (osmozilla, Win32 and Linux) and Internet Explorer (GPAX, Win32 and PPC 2003).

=== Streaming ===
As of version 0.4.5, GPAC has some server-side and streaming tools:

- MP4/3GP file RTP streamer (unicast and multicast),
- RTP streamer with service timeslicing (DVB-H) simulation,
- MPEG-2 TS broadcaster using MP4/3GP files or RTP streams as inputs,
- BIFS RTP broadcaster tool performing live encoding and RandomAccessPoints generation.

== Contributors ==
The project is hosted at Télécom Paris, a leading French engineering school. Current main contributors of GPAC are:

- Jean Le Feuvre
- Romain Bouqueau
- Aurélien David

Other (current or past) contributors are:

- Cyril Concolato
- Deniz Uğur
- Jérôme Gorin
- Pierre Souchay
- Jean-Claude Moissinac
- Jean-Claude Dufourd
- Benoit Pellan
- Philippe de Cuetos.

Additionally, GPAC is used at Télécom Paris and other universities for pedagogical purposes. Students regularly participate in the development of the project.
