= CSS animations =

CSS3 properties that would let some HTML elements animate

CSS Animations
- CSS Animations Level 1
- Interactive SVG using a hover effect
- Abbreviation: CSS-ANIMATIONS-1
- Native name: CSS Animations
- Status: W3C Working Draft
- First published: 20 March 2009
- Latest version: Level 1 March 2, 2023
- Preview version: Level 2 March 2, 2023
- Organization: World Wide Web Consortium
- Committee: CSS Working Group
- Editors: Dean Jackson; L. David Baron; Tab Atkins Jr.; Brian Birtles; David Hyatt; Chris Marrin; Sylvain Galineau
- Base standards: CSS
- Domain: CSS
- Website: www.w3.org/TR/css-animations-1/

CSS animations is a module for Cascading Style Sheets that allows the animation of HTML document elements using CSS.

== History ==
While the pseudo-class :hover has been used to generate rudimentary animations for years, extensions of CSS into the realm of animation were minimal until the late 2000s. As early as 2007, WebKit had announced its intent to include CSS animation, transitions, and transforms as features of WebKit. It also announced the implementation of both implicit and explicit animation through CSS in February 2009. CSS animation has also been put forth as a feature of CSS3, the ongoing draft specification managed by the World Wide Web Consortium (W3C).

== Current ==
CSS Animations is a module of Cascading Style Sheets. It allows users to hover over objects and an animation will play. Currently, it is adopted by all major search engines. Despite the controversy from those who prefer animation via Javascript, the hover tag is now widely used across the Cascading Style Sheets community.

== Scalable Vector Graphics ==
Animated SVG using CSS 3

In addition to hover, Scalable Vector Graphics supports the @keyframes at-rule, allowing a limited set of transformations to be animated. Firefox and Chrome used the @-moz-keyframes and @-webkit-keyframes extensions, respectively, before @keyframes was added to the CSS 3 specification.

== Browser support ==
As of June 2011, Firefox 5 includes CSS animations support. CSS animation is also available as a module in the nightly builds of WebKit as well as Google Chrome, Safari 4 and 5 and Safari for iOS (iPhone, iPod Touch, iPad), Android versions 2.x and 3.x, Internet Explorer 10+ and Microsoft Edge browser, the BlackBerry OS 6 web browser, with the -webkit- prefix. It is also used in iTunes 9 to support iTunes LP files.

== Controversy ==
Early on in the development of the CSS animation it had drawn concern from those who prefer animation via JavaScript or, to a lesser-used extent, Synchronized Multimedia Integration Language (SMIL); others have claimed that it is a move by Apple Inc., the main sponsor of the WebKit project, to sidestep the inclusion of Adobe Flash (and the incumbent Flash animations) on the company's iOS line of mobile devices which use Safari. Furthermore, although Cascading Style Sheets is a relatively easy to use programming language, many programmers still struggle with making animations. With this problem, several individuals and websites have developed and created open source CSS button animations with code for users to copy. However, even with these previous controversies, CSS animations can be predominantly found and widely used across the internet.

== See also ==
- Flash animation
- SVG animation
