= Program-specific information =

Metadata about a program of MPEG transport stream

Program-specific information (PSI) is metadata about a program (channel) and part of an MPEG transport stream.

The PSI data as defined by ISO/IEC 13818-1 (MPEG-2 Part 1: Systems) includes four tables:

- PAT (Program Association Table)
- CAT (Conditional Access Table)
- PMT (Program Mapping Table)
- NIT (Network Information Table)

The MPEG-2 specification does not specify the format of the CAT and NIT.

PSI is carried in the form of a table structure. Each table structure is broken into sections, although some tables like a PMT cannot have more than one section. Each section can span multiple transport stream packets. On the other hand, although this is uncommon, a transport stream packet or set of packets under the same PID can contain multiple sections belonging to different tables. Adaptation field also occurs in TS packets carrying PSI data. The PSI data will never be scrambled so that the decoder at the receiving end can easily identify the properties of the stream.

The sections comprising the PAT and CAT tables are associated with predefined PIDs (Packet Identifier) and table IDs as explained in their respective descriptions below. There may be multiple independent PMTs in a stream, one for each program. Each PMT is given a unique user-defined PID and maps a program number to the metadata describing that program and the streams within it. PMT PIDs are defined in the PAT, and are the only PIDs defined there. The streams themselves are contained in PES packets with user-defined PIDs specified in the PMT.

== PSI structure ==
=== Table Sections ===
Pointer
Name	Number of bits	Description
Pointer field	8	Present at the start of the TS packet payload signaled by the payload_unit_start_indicator bit in the TS header. Used to set packet alignment bytes or content before the start of tabled payload data.
Skipped bytes	N*8	When the pointer field is non-zero, this is the pointer field number of skipped bytes (usually belonging to the previous table section spanning across TS packets).

Section header
Name	Number of bits	Description
Table ID	8	Table Identifier, that defines the structure of the syntax section and other contained data. As an exception, if this is the byte that immediately follow previous table section and is set to 0xFF, then it indicates that the repeat of table section end here and the rest of TS packet payload shall be stuffed with 0xFF. Consequently, the value 0xFF shall not be used for the Table Identifier.
Section syntax indicator	1	A flag that indicates if the long section header syntax is used (fields following Section Length are present). The PAT, PMT, and CAT all set this to 1.
Private bit	1	The PAT, PMT, and CAT all set this to 0. Other tables set this to 1.
Reserved bits	2	Set to 0x03 (all bits on)
Section length unused bits	2	Set to 0 (all bits off)
Section length	10	The number of bytes that follow, including long header, data, and CRC value. Must be <=1021 for PAT, CAT, and PMT, but can be 4093 for private sections and some others.

Section long header (present if section syntax indicator is 1)
Name	Number of bits	Description
Table ID extension	16	Supplemental identifier. The PAT uses this for the transport stream identifier and the PMT uses this for the Program number.
Reserved bits	2	Set to 0x03 (all bits on)
Version number	5	Table version number. Incremented when data is changed and wrapped around on overflow for values greater than 32.
Current/next indicator	1	Indicates if data is currently in effect or will be made effective in the near future. If the bit is 1, the data is to be used now. If 0, the decoder may begin to prepare for the data to change.
Section number	8	This is the index of the section within its table. The first section starts from 0.
Last section number	8	This indicates the total number of sections in the table, minus 1.

Section data and checksum
Name	Number of bits	Description
Section data	N*8	Data as defined by the Table Identifier.
CRC-32	32	A checksum of the entire section excluding the pointer field, pointer filler bytes and the trailing CRC-32.

=== Descriptor ===
Descriptor
Name	Number of bits	Description
descriptor tag	8	the tag defines the structure of the contained data following the descriptor length.
descriptor length	8	The number of bytes that are to follow.
Descriptor data	N*8	Data as defined by the Descriptor Tag.

=== PAT (Program Association Table) ===
The program association table (PAT) lists all programs available in the transport stream. Each of the listed programs is identified by a 16-bit value called program_number. Each of the programs listed in PAT has an associated value of PID for its PMT.

The value 0x0000 for program_number is reserved to specify the PID where to look for network information table. If such a program is not present in PAT the default PID value (0x0010) shall be used for NIT.

TS packets containing PAT information always have PID 0x0000.

PAT specific data repeated until end of section length
Name	Number of bits	Description
Program num	16	Relates to the Table ID extension in the associated PMT. A value of 0 is reserved for a NIT packet identifier.
Reserved bits	3	Set to 0x07 (all bits on)
Program map PID	13	The packet identifier that contains the associated PMT

The PAT is assigned PID 0x0000 and table id of 0x00. The transport stream contains at least one or more TS packets with PID 0x0000. Some of these consecutive packets form the PAT. At the decoder side the PSI section filter listens to the incoming TS packets. After the filter identifies the PAT table they assemble the packet and decode it. A PAT has information about all the programs contained in the TS. The PAT contains information showing the association of Program Map Table PID and Program Number. The PAT should end with a 32-bit CRC

=== PMT (Program map specific data) ===
PMTs contain information about programs. For each program, there is one PMT. While the MPEG-2 standard permits more than one PMT section to be transmitted on a single PID (Single Transport stream PID contains PMT information of more than one program), most MPEG-2 "users" such as ATSC and SCTE require each PMT to be transmitted on a separate PID that is not used for any other packets. The PMTs provide information on each program present in the transport stream, including the program_number, and list the elementary streams that comprise the described MPEG-2 program. There are also locations for optional descriptors that describe the entire MPEG-2 program, as well as an optional descriptor for each elementary stream. Each elementary stream is labeled with a stream_type value.

PMT specific data
Name	Number of bits	Description
Reserved bits	3	Set to 0x07 (all bits on)
PCR PID	13	The packet identifier that contains the program clock reference used to improve the random access accuracy of the stream's timing that is derived from the program timestamp. If this is unused. then it is set to 0x1FFF (all bits on).
Reserved bits	4	Set to 0x0F (all bits on)
Program info length unused bits	2	Set to 0 (all bits off)
Program info length	10	The number of bytes that follow for the program descriptors.
Program descriptors	N*8	When the program info length is non-zero, this is the program info length number of program descriptor bytes.
Elementary stream info data	N*8	The streams used in this program map.

Elementary stream specific data repeated until end of section length
Name	Number of bits	Description
stream type	8	This defines the structure of the data contained within the elementary packet identifier.
Reserved bits	3	Set to 0x07 (all bits on)
Elementary PID	13	The packet identifier that contains the stream type data.
Reserved bits	4	Set to 0x0F (all bits on)
ES Info length unused bits	2	Set to 0 (all bits off)
ES Info length	10	The number of bytes that follow for the elementary stream descriptors.
Elementary stream descriptors	N*8	When the ES info length is non-zero, this is the ES info length number of elementary stream descriptor bytes.

This table contains PID numbers of elementary streams associated with the program and it has information about the type of these elementary streams (video, audio, etc.). In addition it may also contain an ECM (entitlement control messages) stream for any other stream that is encrypted. These messages provide the information used in the cipher key selection stage.

=== CAT (Conditional access specific data) ===
- Table ID value is 0x01.

This table is used for conditional access management of the cypher keys used for decryption of restricted streams. This table contains privately defined descriptors of the system used and the associated EMM PID. It is used by a network provider to maintain regular key updates.

=== NIT (Network information specific data) ===
This optional table may group transport stream identifiers into a network, providing access parameters and other details. ITU-T Rec. H.222 and ISO/IEC 13818-1 do not define the NIT structure. The European Broadcasting Union DVB specification ETSI EN 300 468 (DVB-SI) does. The purpose of mentioning but not defining this table in H.222 is that it has reserved program number 0 (zero) in the PAT. The Table ID extension is used to identify the local network together with a directory listing of transport streams. Descriptors are used to list the modulation, source of those streams and programs. The original network identifier is meant to allow transport streams and programs on foreign networks to be included in the local network which allows no remapping of transport and program IDs that may be duplicated between networks. The DVB specification defines the transport packet identifier as 16 and the table identifier of the local network of transports as 64. A table identifier of 65 is for a foreign network of transports. The network identifiers are maintained via DVB Services who have separated the identifiers into two unique, yet unnecessary groupings of Network_ID and Original_Network_ID. The two groupings have a large number of overlapping entries.

== PSI labels ==
=== Table Identifiers ===
Each table in a transport stream is identified by an 8-bit table identifier.

Identifiers in use
Decimal	Hexadecimal	Description
0	0x00	Program Association section contains a directory listing of all Program Map Tables
1	0x01	Conditional Access section contains a directory listing of all EMM streams
2	0x02	Program Map section contains a directory listing of all elementary streams.
3	0x03	Transport Stream Description section.
4	0x04	ISO/IEC 14496 scene description section.
5	0x05	ISO/IEC 14496 object description section.
6	0x06	Metadata section.
7	0x07	ISO/IEC 13818-11 IPMP control information (DRM).
8 - 57	0x08 - 0x39	Reserved.
58	0x3A	ISO/IEC 13818-6 DSM CC multiprotocol encapsulated.
59	0x3B	ISO/IEC 13818-6 DSM CC U-N messages.
60	0x3C	ISO/IEC 13818-6 DSM CC Download Data Messages.
61	0x3D	ISO/IEC 13818-6 DSM CC stream descriptor list.
62	0x3E	ISO/IEC 13818-6 DSM CC privately defined (used by DVB MAC addressed datagrams).
63	0x3F	ISO/IEC 13818-6 DSM CC addressable.
64 - 127	0x40 - 0x7F	Used by DVB.
128 - 143	0x80 - 0x8F	DVB-CSA and DigiCipher II/ATSC CA message sections used in EMM and ECM streams.
144 - 191	0x90 - 0xBF	May be assigned as needed to other data tables.
192 - 254	0xC0 - 0xFE	Used by DigiCipher II/ATSC/SCTE.
255	0xFF	Forbidden. As is used for null padding.

SCTE Specific tables:
0xCO table id is used by Programme Information Message
0xC1 table id is used by Programme Name Message
It is not necessary that pid of PMT pointed by PAT will contain a table with table id 0x02 Ignoring table id while reading PMT could have bad consequence

=== Program and Elementary Stream Descriptor Tags ===
Each descriptor in a transport stream table is identified by an 8-bit descriptor tag.

Tags in use
Decimal	Hexadecimal	Description
0 - 1	0x00 - 0x01	Reserved.
2	0x02	Video stream header parameters for ITU-T Rec. H.262, ISO/IEC 13818-2 and ISO/IEC 11172-2
3	0x03	Audio stream header parameters for ISO/IEC 13818-3 and ISO/IEC 11172-3
4	0x04	Hierarchy for stream selection
5	0x05	Registration of private formats
6	0x06	Data stream alignment for packetized video and audio sync point
7	0x07	Target background grid defines total display area size
8	0x08	Video Window defines position in display area
9	0x09	Conditional access system and EMM/ECM PID
10	0x0A	ISO 639 language and audio type
11	0x0B	System clock external reference
12	0x0C	Multiplex buffer utilization bounds
13	0x0D	Copyright identification system and reference
14	0x0E	Maximum bit rate
15	0x0F	Private data indicator
16	0x10	Smoothing buffer
17	0x11	STD video buffer leak control
18	0x12	IBP video I-frame indicator
19	0x13	ISO/IEC13818-6 DSM CC carousel identifier
20	0x14	ISO/IEC13818-6 DSM CC association tag
21	0x15	ISO/IEC13818-6 DSM CC deferred association tag
22	0x16	ISO/IEC13818-6 DSM CC Reserved.
23	0x17	DSM CC NPT reference
24	0x18	DSM CC NPT endpoint
25	0x19	DSM CC stream mode
26	0x1A	DSM CC stream event
27	0x1B	Video stream header parameters for ISO/IEC 14496-2 (MPEG-4 H.263 based)
28	0x1C	Audio stream header parameters for ISO/IEC 14496-3 (MPEG-4 LOAS multi-format framed)
29	0x1D	IOD parameters for ISO/IEC 14496-1
30	0x1E	SL parameters for ISO/IEC 14496-1
31	0x1F	FMC parameters for ISO/IEC 14496-1
32	0x20	External ES identifier for ISO/IEC 14496-1
33	0x21	MuxCode for ISO/IEC 14496-1
34	0x22	FMX Buffer Size for ISO/IEC 14496-1
35	0x23	Multiplex Buffer for ISO/IEC 14496-1
36	0x24	Content labeling for ISO/IEC 14496-1
37	0x25	Metadata pointer
38	0x26	Metadata
39	0x27	Metadata STD
40	0x28	Video stream header parameters for ITU-T Rec. H.264 and ISO/IEC 14496-10
41	0x29	ISO/IEC 13818-11 IPMP (DRM)
42	0x2A	Timing and HRD for ITU-T Rec. H.264 and ISO/IEC 14496-10
43	0x2B	Audio stream header parameters for ISO/IEC 13818-7 ADTS AAC
44	0x2C	FlexMux Timing for ISO/IEC 14496-1
45	0x2D	Text stream header parameters for ISO/IEC 14496
46	0x2E	Audio extension stream header parameters for ISO/IEC 14496-3 (MPEG-4 LOAS multi-format framed)
47	0x2F	Video auxiliary stream header parameters
48	0x30	Video scalable stream header parameters
49	0x31	Video multi stream header parameters
50	0x32	Video stream header parameters for ITU-T Rec. T.800 and ISO/IEC 15444 (JPEG 2000)
51	0x33	Video multi operation point stream header parameters
52	0x34	Video stereoscopic (3D) stream header parameters for ITU-T Rec. H.262, ISO/IEC 13818-2 and ISO/IEC 11172-2
53	0x35	Program stereoscopic (3D) information
54	0x36	Video stereoscopic (3D) information
55 - 63	0x37 - 0x3F	Reserved.
64 - 127	0x40 - 0x7F	Used by DVB.
128 - 207	0x80 - 0xCF	Used by ATSC.
160	0xA0	VideoLAN FourCC, video size and codec initialization data
208 - 223	0xD0 - 0xDF	Used by ISDB.
224 - 233	0xE0 - 0xE9	Used by CableLabs.
234 - 254	0xEA - 0xFE	May be assigned as needed to other descriptors.
255	0xFF	Forbidden. As is used for null padding.

=== Elementary stream types ===
Each elementary stream in a transport stream is identified by an 8-bit elementary stream type assignment.

Assignments in use
Decimal	Hexadecimal	Description
0	0x00	Reserved
1	0x01	ISO/IEC 11172-2 (MPEG-1 video) in a packetized stream
2	0x02	ITU-T Rec. H.262 and ISO/IEC 13818-2 (MPEG-2 higher rate interlaced video) in a packetized stream
3	0x03	ISO/IEC 11172-3 (MPEG-1 audio) in a packetized stream
4	0x04	ISO/IEC 13818-3 (MPEG-2 halved sample rate audio) in a packetized stream
5	0x05	ITU-T Rec. H.222 and ISO/IEC 13818-1 (MPEG-2 tabled data) privately defined
6	0x06	ITU-T Rec. H.222 and ISO/IEC 13818-1 (MPEG-2 packetized data) privately defined (i.e., DVB subtitles/VBI and AC-3)
7	0x07	ISO/IEC 13522 (MHEG) in a packetized stream
8	0x08	ITU-T Rec. H.222 and ISO/IEC 13818-1 DSM CC in a packetized stream
9	0x09	ITU-T Rec. H.222 and ISO/IEC 13818-1/11172-1 auxiliary data in a packetized stream
10	0x0A	ISO/IEC 13818-6 DSM CC multiprotocol encapsulation
11	0x0B	ISO/IEC 13818-6 DSM CC U-N messages
12	0x0C	ISO/IEC 13818-6 DSM CC stream descriptors
13	0x0D	ISO/IEC 13818-6 DSM CC tabled data
14	0x0E	ISO/IEC 13818-1 auxiliary data in a packetized stream
15	0x0F	ISO/IEC 13818-7 ADTS AAC (MPEG-2 lower bit-rate audio) in a packetized stream
16	0x10	ISO/IEC 14496-2 (MPEG-4 H.263 based video) in a packetized stream
17	0x11	ISO/IEC 14496-3 (MPEG-4 LOAS multi-format framed audio) in a packetized stream
18	0x12	ISO/IEC 14496-1 (MPEG-4 FlexMux) in a packetized stream
19	0x13	ISO/IEC 14496-1 (MPEG-4 FlexMux) in ISO/IEC 14496 tables
20	0x14	ISO/IEC 13818-6 DSM CC synchronized download protocol
21	0x15	Packetized metadata
22	0x16	Sectioned metadata
23	0x17	ISO/IEC 13818-6 DSM CC Data Carousel metadata
24	0x18	ISO/IEC 13818-6 DSM CC Object Carousel metadata
25	0x19	ISO/IEC 13818-6 Synchronized Download Protocol metadata
26	0x1A	ISO/IEC 13818-11 IPMP
27	0x1B	ITU-T Rec. H.264 and ISO/IEC 14496-10 (lower bit-rate video) in a packetized stream
28	0x1C	ISO/IEC 14496-3 (MPEG-4 raw audio) in a packetized stream
29	0x1D	ISO/IEC 14496-17 (MPEG-4 text) in a packetized stream
30	0x1E	ISO/IEC 23002-3 (MPEG-4 auxiliary video) in a packetized stream
31	0x1F	ISO/IEC 14496-10 SVC (MPEG-4 AVC sub-bitstream) in a packetized stream
32	0x20	ISO/IEC 14496-10 MVC (MPEG-4 AVC sub-bitstream) in a packetized stream
33	0x21	ITU-T Rec. T.800 and ISO/IEC 15444 (JPEG 2000 video) in a packetized stream
34 - 35	0x22 - 0x23	Reserved.
36	0x24	ITU-T Rec. H.265 and ISO/IEC 23008-2 (Ultra HD video) in a packetized stream
37 - 65	0x25 - 0x41	Reserved.
66	0x42	Chinese Video Standard in a packetized stream
67 - 126	0x43 - 0x7e	Reserved.
127	0x7f	ISO/IEC 13818-11 IPMP (DRM) in a packetized stream
128	0x80	ITU-T Rec. H.262 and ISO/IEC 13818-2 with DES-64-CBC encryption for DigiCipher II or PCM audio for Blu-ray in a packetized stream
129	0x81	Dolby Digital (AC-3) up to six channel audio for ATSC and Blu-ray in a packetized stream
130	0x82	SCTE subtitle or DTS 6 channel audio for Blu-ray in a packetized stream
131	0x83	Dolby TrueHD lossless audio for Blu-ray in a packetized stream
132	0x84	Dolby Digital Plus (enhanced AC-3) up to 16 channel audio for Blu-ray in a packetized stream
133	0x85	DTS 8 channel audio for Blu-ray in a packetized stream
134	0x86	SCTE-35 digital program insertion cue message or DTS 8 channel lossless audio for Blu-ray in a packetized stream
135	0x87	Dolby Digital Plus (enhanced AC-3) up to 16 channel audio for ATSC in a packetized stream
136 - 143	0x88 - 0x8F	Privately defined.
144	0x90	Blu-ray Presentation Graphic Stream (subtitling) in a packetized stream
145	0x91	ATSC DSM CC Network Resources table
146 - 191	0x92 - 0xBF	Privately defined.
192	0xC0	DigiCipher II text in a packetized stream
193	0xC1	Dolby Digital (AC-3) up to six channel audio with AES-128-CBC data encryption in a packetized stream
194	0xC2	ATSC DSM CC synchronous data or Dolby Digital Plus up to 16 channel audio with AES-128-CBC data encryption in a packetized stream
195 - 206	0xC3 - 0xCE	Privately defined.
207	0xCF	ISO/IEC 13818-7 ADTS AAC with AES-128-CBC frame encryption in a packetized stream
208	0xD0	Privately defined.
209	0xD1	BBC Dirac (Ultra HD video) in a packetized stream
210	0xD2	Audio Video Standard AVS2 (Ultra HD video) in a packetized stream
211	0xD3	Audio Video Standard AVS3 Audio in a packetized stream
212	0xD4	Audio Video Standard AVS3 Video (Ultra HD video) in a packetized stream
213 - 218	0xD5 - 0xDA	Privately defined.
219	0xDB	ITU-T Rec. H.264 and ISO/IEC 14496-10 with AES-128-CBC slice encryption in a packetized stream
220 - 233	0xDC - 0xE9	Privately defined.
234	0xEA	Microsoft Windows Media Video 9 (lower bit-rate video) in a packetized stream
235 - 255	0xEB - 0xFF	Privately defined.
