= Extensible MPEG-4 Textual Format =

The Extensible MPEG-4 Textual Format (XMT) is a high-level, XML-based file format for storing MPEG-4 data in a way suitable for further editing. In contrast, the more common MPEG-4 Part 14 (MP4) format is less flexible and used for distributing finished content.

It was developed by MPEG (ISO/IEC JTC 1/SC29/WG11) and defined in MPEG-4 Part 11 Scene description and application engine (ISO/IEC 14496-11).

XMT provides a textual representation of the MPEG-4 binary composition technology, based on XML. The XMT framework accommodates substantial portions of SMIL, W3C Scalable Vector Graphics (SVG) and X3D (the new name of VRML). Such a representation can be directly played back by a SMIL or VRML player, but can also be binarised to become a native MPEG-4 representation that can be played by an MPEG-4 player. Another bridge has been created with BiM (Binary MPEG format for XML).

== See also ==
- MPEG-4 Part 11
