= DSM CC =

Digital storage media command and control

Digital storage media command and control (DSM-CC) is a toolkit for developing control channels associated with MPEG-1 and MPEG-2 streams. It is defined in part 6 of the MPEG-2 standard (Extensions for DSM-CC) and uses a client/server model connected via an underlying network (carried via the MPEG-2 multiplex or independently if needed).

DSM-CC may be used for controlling the video reception, providing features normally found on Video Cassette Recorders (VCR) (fast-forward, rewind, pause, etc.). It may also be used for a wide variety of other purposes including packet data transport. It is defined by a series of weighty standards, principally MPEG-2 ISO/IEC 13818-6 (part 6 of the MPEG-2 standard).

DSM-CC may work in conjunction with next generation packet networks, working alongside such internet protocols as RSVP, RTSP, RTP and SCP. Although DSM-CC is usually associated with video delivery (via satellite or terrestrially) and with interactive content, it is also used among audio servers and clients. The architecture describes three main parts of the system: the client, the server, and the session resource manager (SRM). The server provides content and other services to the client, and both are "clients" of the SRM. The SRM allocates and manages network resources (such as channels, bandwidth, and network addresses.) By combining server and client components together onto the same platforms, peer-to-peer content access and delivery systems can be constructed.

These specifications include numerous implementation options. For example, MPEG-2 video can be encoded in different ways, and a DSM-CC system can be constructed to include or exclude certain features and interfaces. Normally, an outside specification will define a profile of specific options, allowing systems built using common profiles to interoperate.

DSM-CC defines or extends five distinct protocols:

User-User
Allows remote access by the client to objects on the server. The User-User specification goes beyond the definition of specific server object classes to define classes local to the client, as well as some of the interaction with other parts of the system. The distributed object model is based on CORBA. Objects are accessed using the internet inter-ORB protocol (IIOP), with some optional extensions. Two subsets, "core" and "extended", are defined. In the model, some clients may also load content onto the server.

User-Network
There are two parts to this protocol: Session and Resource. This protocol is used between the client and SRM, and between the server and SRM. The U-N Session protocol is used to establish sessions with the network, associated with resources which are allocated and released using the U-N Resource protocol.

MPEG transport profiles
The specification provides profiles to the standard MPEG transport protocol (defined by ISO/IEC 13818-1) to allow transmission of event, synchronization, download, and other information in the MPEG transport stream.

Download
Several variations of this protocol allow transfer of content from server to client, either within the MPEG transport stream or on a separate (presumably high-speed) channel. Flow-controlled download allows the download operations to be negotiated and controlled by the client. A variation of download is an autonomous "data carousel" on the server which repeatedly downloads information; the download carousel client waits for the information without initiating the transfer. An extension to the data carousel is the "object carousel", which presents downloaded information as objects compatible with the objects defined by the User-User API. (The choice of download or IIOP protocols is embedded in the object's IOR, so the means of access is transparent to the client application.)

Switched Digital Broadcast-Channel Change Protocol (SDB/CCP)
Enables a client to remotely switch from channel to channel in a broadcast environment. Used to attach a client to a continuous-feed session (CFS) or other broadcast feed. Sometimes used in pay-per-view.

An implementation does not always need all of these protocols. Almost all implementations in the real world use a subset.

== Extension ==
Delivery Multimedia Integration Framework (DMIF) expands upon the MPEG-2 DSM-CC standard (ISO/IEC 13818-6:1998) to enable the convergence of interactive, broadcast and conversational multimedia into one specification which will be applicable to set tops, desktops and mobile stations. The DSM-CC work was extended as part of the ISO/IEC 14496-6 (MPEG-4 Part 6), with the DSM-CC Multimedia Integration Framework (DMIF).
