= SVG filter effects =

Graphics file modifier

Filter Effects
- Filter Effects Module Level 1
- Wood texture and drop shadow simulated with SVG filters
- Status: Working Draft (WD)
- Year started: 15 October 2012
- First published: 15 October 2012
- Latest version: December 18, 2018
- Preview version: Editor's Draft; October 30, 2019
- Organization: W3C
- Committee: CSS Working Group
- Editors: Dirk Schulze; Dean Jackson; Vincent Hardy; Erik Dahlström
- Domain: Visual effects

SVG filter effects are effects applied to Scalable Vector Graphics (SVG) files. SVG is an open-standard XML format for two-dimensional vector graphics as defined by the World Wide Web Consortium (W3C). A filter effect consists of a series of graphics operations that are applied to a given source vector graphic to produce a modified bitmapped result.

Filter effects are defined by filter elements. The filter property is set on a container element or on a graphics element to apply a filter effect to it. Each filter element contains a set of filter primitives as its children. Each filter primitive performs a single fundamental graphical operation (e.g., a Gaussian blur or a lighting effect) on one or more inputs, producing a graphical result. Because most of the filter primitives represent some form of image processing, in most cases the output from a filter primitive is a single RGBA bitmap image (however, it will be regenerated if a higher resolution is called on).

The original source graphic or the result from a filter primitive can be used as input into one or more other filter primitives. A common application is to use the source graphic multiple times. For example, a simple filter could replace one graphic for two by adding a black copy of the original source graphic but offset to create a drop shadow. In effect, there are now two layers of graphics, both with the same original source graphics.

== SVG filter primitives ==
Example SVG using various filter primitives: Textures: / feTurbulence, feDiffuseLighting, feDistantLight, feComposite and feBlend; Shadows: / feGaussianBlur, feOffset, feColorMatrix and feBlend

Demonstration of an animated refraction effect using feTurbulence, feDisplacementMap and Synchronized Multimedia Integration Language

The following table lists the filter primitives available in both SVG 1.0 and SVG 1.1. SVG Tiny does not support filter effects, while SVG Basic supports only those filter primitives shown:

Name	Element	SVG Basic
Blend	feBlend	Yes
Color matrix	feColorMatrix	Yes
Component transfer	feComponentTransfer	Yes
Composite	feComposite	Yes
Convolve matrix	feConvolveMatrix	No
Diffuse lighting	feDiffuseLighting	No
Displacement map	feDisplacementMap	No
Flood	feFlood	Yes
Gaussian blur	feGaussianBlur	Yes
Image	feImage	Yes
Merge	feMerge	Yes
Morphology	feMorphology	No
Offset	feOffset	Yes
Specular lighting	feSpecularLighting	No
Tile	feTile	Yes
Turbulence	feTurbulence	No

The current draft of the Filter Effects Module Level 1 adds a filter primitive for drop shadow. This primitive, feDropShadow, is just a shorthand for a combination of other filter primitives.

== Framework for applying a filter ==
<?xml version="1.0"?>
<svg xmlns="http://www.w3.org/2000/svg"
  version="1.1"
  viewBox="0 0 400 300">
  <defs>
    <filter id="AFilter">
      <!-- Definition of filter goes here -->
    </filter>
  </defs>
  <text x="10" y="100" filter="url(#AFilter)">a filter applied</text>
</svg>
