= MPEG-4 Part 11 =

File compression format

MPEG-4 Part 11 Scene description and application engine was published as ISO/IEC 14496-11 in 2005. MPEG-4 Part 11 is also known as BIFS, XMT, MPEG-J. It defines:

- the coded representation of the spatio-temporal positioning of audio-visual objects as well as their behaviour in response to interaction (scene description);
- the coded representation of synthetic two-dimensional (2D) or three-dimensional (3D) objects that can be manifested audibly or visually;
- the Extensible MPEG-4 Textual (XMT) format - a textual representation of the multimedia content described in MPEG-4 using the Extensible Markup Language (XML);
- and a system level description of an application engine (format, delivery, lifecycle, and behaviour of downloadable Java byte code applications). (The MPEG-J Graphics Framework eXtensions (GFX) is defined in MPEG-4 Part 21 - ISO/IEC 14496-21.)

== Binary Format for Scenes ==
Binary Format for Scenes (BIFS) is a binary format for two- or three-dimensional audiovisual content. It is based on VRML and part 11 of the MPEG-4 standard.

BIFS is MPEG-4 scene description protocol to compose MPEG-4 objects, describe interaction with MPEG-4 objects and to animate MPEG-4 objects.

MPEG-4 Binary Format for Scene (BIFS) is used in Digital Multimedia Broadcasting (DMB).

The XMT framework accommodates substantial portions of SMIL, W3C Scalable Vector Graphics (SVG) and X3D (the new name of VRML). Such a representation can be directly played back by a SMIL or VRML player, but can also be binarised to become a native MPEG-4 representation that can be played by an MPEG-4 player. Another bridge has been created with BiM (Binary MPEG format for XML).

== See also ==
- MPEG-4 Part 20 (LASER)
- Scalable Vector Graphics (SVG)
- MPEG-7 - Multimedia content description interface
