= Scan2CAD =

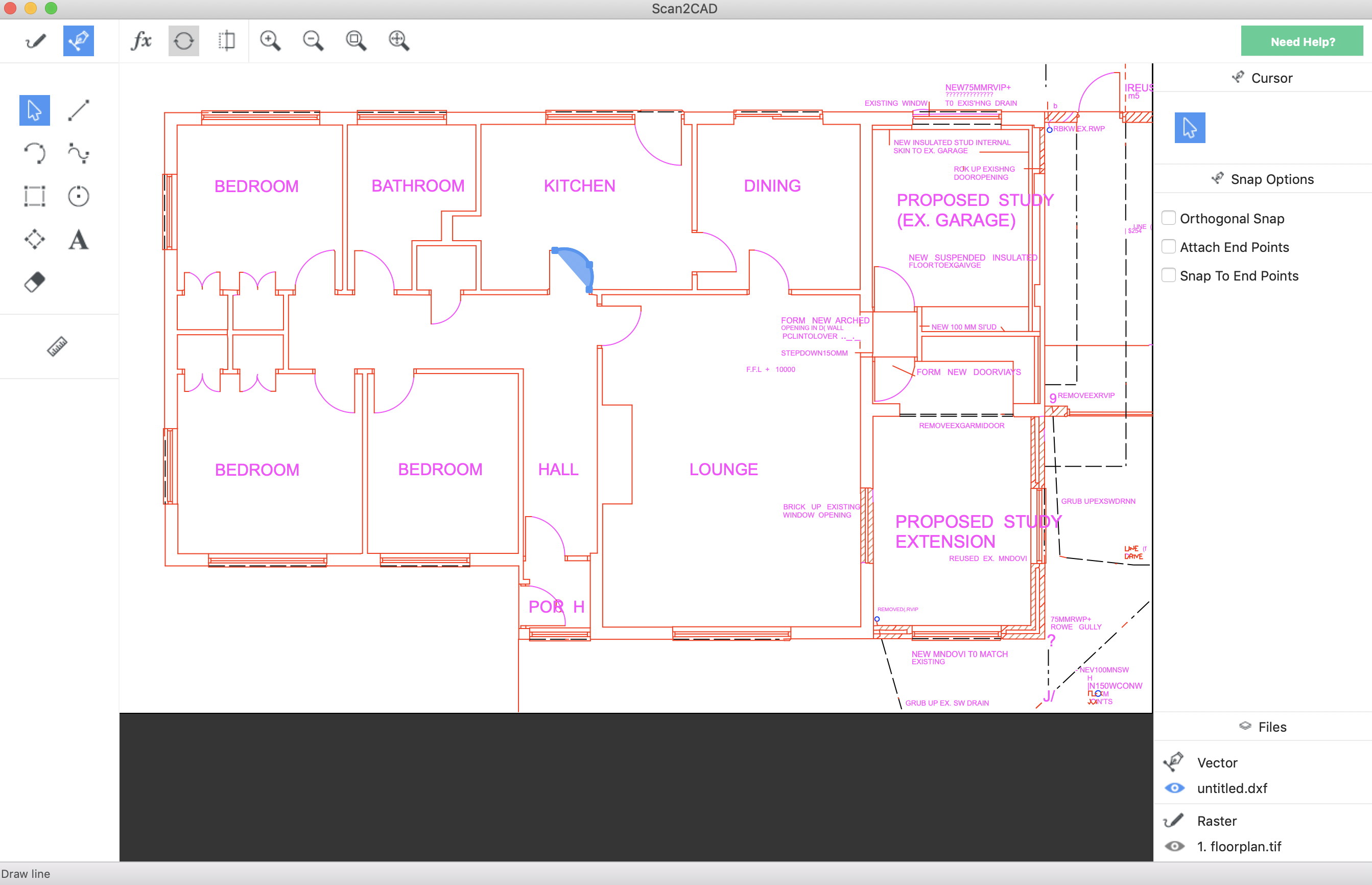
- Screenshot of Scan2CAD 10.0.10 on MacOS
- Developer(s): Avia Systems
- Initial release: April 1993; 32 years ago
- Stable release: 10.6.6 / 21 July 2025; 6 days ago
- Written in: C and C++
- Operating system: Microsoft Windows, macOS (since v10.0.0)
- Available in: Multilingual
- Type: Computer-aided design
- License: Proprietary
- Website: www.scan2cad.com

Scan2CAD is a commercial raster-to-vector and vector-to-vector conversion and editing computer-aided design software application which is developed and maintained in the UK by Avia Systems.

== History ==
Scan2CAD's first version was released in April 1993. The publishing company was Softcover International. This company continued to publish the software until 2010 when Avia Systems acquired the software.

The development team has continued to be the same throughout the full lifetime of the software.

Scan2CAD is now used across the world by a very wide variety of users ranging from government and large industrial organisations to smaller individual firms. It has been translated to localised language versions including Polish, Italian, French and Japanese. The Scan2CAD software is recommended by leading imaging hardware companies such as HP, Canon and Fuji Xerox.

== Code Names ==
From version 10.0 Scan2CAD's major version releases use code names that reference great mathematicians.

It was described that these code names are intended to "take inspiration" from the stories of these mathematicians.

Version number	Code name	Initial release date	Mathematician who inspired code name
10.0	Euclid	July 17, 2018	Eukleides of Alexandria
10.1	Galois	March 1, 2019	Évariste Galois
10.2	Lovelace	November 12, 2019	Ada Lovelace
10.3	Cantor	May 25, 2020	Georg Cantor
10.4	Gauss	October 8, 2020	Carl Friedrich Gauss
10.5	Hilbert	June 26, 2024	David Hilbert

== Supported file types ==
Below lists all types of the file supported by Scan2CAD starting from version 8.

Raster file types: BMP, PCX, IMG, TIFF, CALS, JPEG, JPEG2K, GIF, PNG, CIT, PDF

Vector file types: DXF, DWG, SVG, HPGL, WMF, EMF, TXF, PDF (vector graphics)

== Technologies used ==
A non-exhaustive list of the technologies used by Scan2CAD in the raster-to-vector and vector-to-vector conversion process.

Methodology	Process
Vectorization/Image tracing	Conversion
Artificial neural networks	Conversion
Object recognition	Conversion
Optical Character Recognition (OCR)	Conversion
Adaptive Classifier or Cube	Conversion
Gaussian function	Raster Processing
Thresholding	Raster Processing
Edge detection/Edge following	Raster Processing
Canny edge detection	Raster Processing
Blob detection	Raster Processing
Image segmentation	Raster Processing
Image thinning/Image erosion	Raster Processing
