= Comparison of raster-to-vector conversion software =

The following tables contain general and technical information about publicly available raster-to-vector conversion software.

== General information ==
	Creator	Year released	Year last updated	List price (USD)	License	Supported OS (without emulation)
CorelDRAW	Cascade Parent Limited d.b.a Alludo; Formerly called the Corel Corporation	1989	2023 (version 24.3)	$449, $169 upgrade	Proprietary	Windows
Easy Trace	InterVek LLC (Russian: ООО ИнтерВек) d.b.a. Easy Trace Group (Russian: Группа Easy Trace)	?	2023 (version 12.4)	€960, €480 upgrade (Easy Trace Pro); Versions 7.99 and 8.65 are free (Easy Trace)	Proprietary	Windows
Adobe Illustrator	Adobe Inc. Formerly called Adobe Systems Inc.	1985	2023 (version 27.8.1)	$19.99 per month	Proprietary	Windows, macOS
PhotoLine	Computerinsel GmbH	1996	2023 (version 24.01)	$86, $42 upgrade	Proprietary	Windows, macOS
Graphic Tracer Professional	Steve Boek; Graphic Powers AB	2016	2023 (version 12:2)	$15 per month or $120 per year	Proprietary	Windows
Inkscape (uses Potrace, Autotrace and Libdepixelize)	Inkscape.org	2003	2024 (version 1.4)	Free	GPL-2.0-or-later	Windows, macOS, Linux
ImageTracer	András Jankovics	2015	2020 (version 1.2.6)	Free	Public domain (Unlicense)	Cross-platform (platforms that can run JavaScript or Java)
Potrace	Peter Selinger	2001	2019 (version 1.16)	Free	GPL-2.0-or-later	Cross-platform, Windows and POSIX
Scan2CAD	Avia Systems	1997	2022 (version 10.4.13)	$49–$149 per month	Proprietary	Windows, macOS
WinTopo Freeware	SoftSoft Ltd.	1999	2015 (version 1.76)	Freeware; Free to use for any purpose, including commercial purposes	Proprietary	Windows
WinTopo Pro	SoftSoft Ltd.	2000	2015 (version 3.6)	$299	Proprietary	Windows
Xara Photo & Graphic Designer	Xara Group Ltd.	1994	2023 (version 23.4)	$89.99	Proprietary	Windows
Super Vectorizer	Effectmatrix Ltd.	2013	2016 (version 1.6.6)	$29.99	Proprietary	macOS
AutoTrace	Martin Weber	1998	2024 (version 0.31.10)	Free	GPL-2.0-or-later	Cross-platform, POSIX (mainly Unix-like)
VTracer	Tsang Hao Fung	2020	2022 (version 0.5.0)	Free	MIT	Cross-platform (command-line version); Browsers with WebAssembly support (web version)
SVGcode (uses Potrace)	Thomas Steiner	2021	2023 (version ?)	Free	GPL-2.0-or-later	Android, web (PWA), Windows
Primitive	Michael Fogleman			Free	MIT	MAC OS X, with Python & Go packages and a JavaScript port
KVEC	K. Kuhl			Freeware		WIN 2000, WIN XP, WIN Vista/7, OS/2, Linux, BeOS, MAC OS X
VectorEZ	Asteride Software SAS	2025	2025 (version 1.0.2)	$22	Proprietary	Windows, macOS
	Creator	Year released	Year least updated	List price (USD)	License	Supported OS (without emulation)

=== Basic features ===
NAME	Maximum zoom	Object limit per document	Control point limit	Color management for print	Thumbnails	Adjust image (functions)	Text recognition (OCR)	Scripting support
Easy Trace	12800x	No Limit	?	Yes	Yes	Yes	No	No
Graphic Tracer Professional	No limit	No limit	No limit	No	?	?	Yes	No
Adobe Illustrator	640x	?	?	Yes	?	?	No	Yes
Potrace	—N/a	?	?	No	?	?	No	No
ImageTracer	—N/a	No limit	No limit	No	No	?	No	Yes
Scan2CAD	64K	No limit	No limit	Yes	?	?	Yes	Yes
WinTopo Pro	512x	No limit	No limit	Yes	Yes	Yes	No	Yes
PhotoLine	25600%	No limit	No limit	Yes	Yes	Yes	No	Yes
	Maximum zoom	Object limit per document	Control point limit	Color management for print	Thumbnails	Adjust image (functions)	Text recognition (OCR)	Scripting support

=== CAD features ===
NAME	Export universal DXF	Available in AutoCAD application	Curve recognition	Circle recognition	Arc recognition	Orthogonal line detection	Corner detection	Line connection
Easy Trace	Yes	No	Yes	Yes	Yes	Yes	Yes	Yes
Graphic Tracer Professional	Yes	No	Yes	Yes	Yes	Yes	Yes	Yes
Adobe Illustrator	Yes	No	Yes	Yes	Yes	Yes	Yes	Yes
Potrace	Yes	No	No	?	?	?	Yes	?
ImageTracer	No	No	Yes	No	Yes	Yes	Yes	Yes
Scan2CAD	Yes	Yes	Yes	Yes	Yes	Yes	Yes	Yes
WinTopo Pro	Yes	No	Yes	Yes	Yes	Yes	Yes	Yes
PhotoLine	Yes	No	Yes	No	No	No	Yes	Yes
	Export universal DXF	Available in AutoCAD application	Curve recognition	Circle recognition	Arc recognition	Orthogonal line detection	Corner detection	Line connection

=== Raster editing features ===
	Scanner support	Freehand sketch	Raster filters	Change color depth	Image resize	Rotate	Crop	Raster shapes
Easy Trace	Yes	Yes	Yes	Yes	Yes	Yes	Yes	Yes
Graphic Tracer Professional	Yes	Yes	—N/a	—N/a	Yes	Yes	No	—N/a
Adobe Illustrator	No	No	No	No	Yes	Yes	No	No
Potrace	—N/a	—N/a	—N/a	—N/a	—N/a	—N/a	—N/a	—N/a
ImageTracer	—N/a	—N/a	—N/a	—N/a	—N/a	—N/a	—N/a	—N/a
Scan2CAD	Yes	Yes	Yes	Yes	Yes	Yes	Yes	Yes
WinTopo Pro	Yes	Yes	Yes	Yes	Yes	Yes	Yes	?
AutoTrace	—N/a	—N/a	—N/a	—N/a	—N/a	—N/a	—N/a	—N/a
PhotoLine	Yes	Yes	Yes	Yes	Yes	Yes	Yes	Yes
	Scanner Support	Freehand sketch	Raster Filters	Change color depth	Image resize	Rotate	Crop	Raster Shapes

=== Vector editing features ===
	Fills & hatch	Vector combine	Rotate & move	Polylines	Spline curves	Lines to curves cmd. & vice versa	Vector shapes
Easy Trace	Yes	Yes	Yes	Yes	Yes	Yes	Yes
Graphic Tracer Professional	N/A	Yes	Yes	Yes	Yes	Yes	Yes
Adobe Illustrator	Yes	Yes	Yes	Yes	Yes	No	Yes
Potrace	—N/a	—N/a	—N/a	—N/a	—N/a	—N/a	—N/a
ImageTracer	—N/a	—N/a	—N/a	—N/a	—N/a	—N/a	—N/a
Scan2CAD	Yes	Yes	Yes	Yes	Yes	Yes	Yes
WinTopo Pro	?	Yes	Yes	Yes	Yes	?	?
AutoTrace	—N/a	—N/a	—N/a	—N/a	—N/a	—N/a	—N/a
PhotoLine	Yes	Yes	Yes	Yes	Yes	No	Yes
	Fills & hatch	Vector combine	Rotate & move	Polylines	Spline curves	Lines to curves cmd. & vice versa	Vector shapes

== Discontinued software ==
- Adobe Freehand (1988–2003)
- Adobe Streamline (1989–2001)
- Xara Xtreme for Linux – 2006 open source fork of Xara Photo & Graphic Designer
