= Potrace =

Free raster to vector conversion software

- Developer: Peter Selinger
- Release: 2001
- Stable release: 1.16 / September 17, 2019; 7 years ago
- Written in: C
- Platform: Cross-platform
- Type: Raster-to-vector conversion
- License: Potrace: GPL-2.0-or-later, Potrace Professional: proprietary
- Website: http://potrace.sourceforge.net
- Repository: potrace.sourceforge.net

Potrace (/ˈpoʊtreɪs/) is cross-platform, open-source software which converts bitmapped images into vector graphics. It is written and maintained by Peter Selinger.

== Properties ==
Various graphical frontends are available for the command-line application Potrace. Notably, it has been integrated with Inkscape, giving Inkscape its Trace Bitmap action. FontForge can use Potrace to import a bitmap image into a font. Potrace is also used by the music engraving program LilyPond. An open-source progressive web app that uses Potrace is SVGcode.

Potrace's input and output is black and white (colored images are greyscaled before processing). However, Inkscape is capable of producing color images by decomposing each channel into several black and white images and tracing them separately with Potrace. The commercial Total Vectorize program also uses Potrace as its core.

Potrace is licensed under the GNU General Public License v2.0 or later. A non-GPL version of Potrace called "Potrace Professional" is available under license from Selinger's company, Icosasoft Software, Inc.

== Examples ==
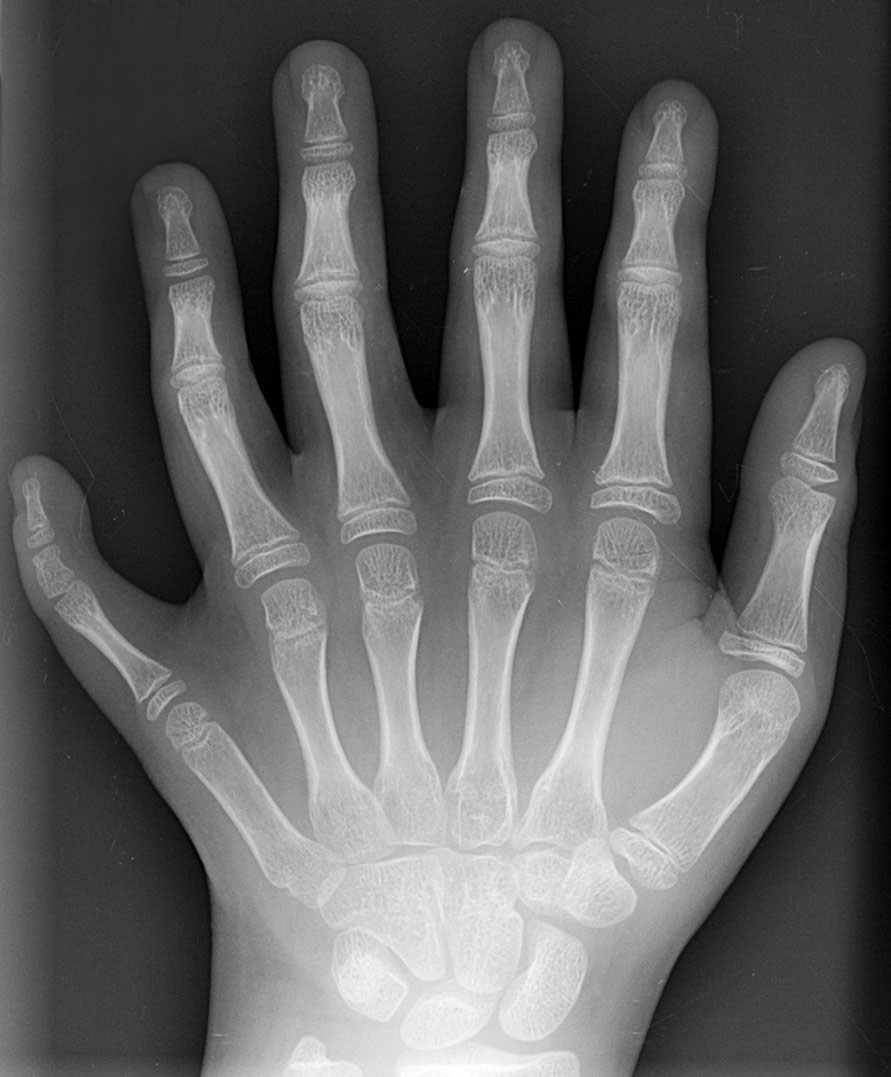
Source image JPEG grayscale (891×1,077 pixel, 119 KB)

Traced with Potrace in Inkscape to an eight-color SVG image in 2006 (50 KB)

Traced with Potrace in Inkscape to an eight-color SVG image in 2012 (336 KB)

Traced with Potrace in Inkscape to a twelve-color SVG image in 2012 (608 KB)

Traced with Potrace in Inkscape to a sixteen-color SVG image in 2012 (743 KB)

== See also ==
- Comparison of raster-to-vector conversion software
