= Data and object carousel =

Transmission technology

In digital video broadcasting (DVB), a data and object carousel is used for repeatedly delivering data in a continuous cycle. Carousels allow data to be pushed from a broadcaster to multiple receivers by transmitting a data set repeatedly in a standard format. A set-top box receiver may tune to the data stream at any time and is able to reconstitute the data into a virtual file system. The carousel may therefore be considered as a transport file system or file broadcasting system that allows data files to be transmitted from the broadcaster to multiple receivers or clients simultaneously.

In a unidirectional broadcast environment, the receiver is unable to request the retransmission of any data that was missed or received incorrectly. Repeated retransmission of data allows the receiver to cope with random tuning to a channel at an unpredictable time, for instance as the user changes a channel.

The carousel cycle period generally determines the maximum time required for a receiver to acquire an application or specific datum. It is possible to reduce the access time for commonly used files by broadcasting some data more often than others.

An individual object carousel is also called a service domain in some documents. To be precise, a service domain is a group of related DSM-CC objects. In broadcast systems, there is no difference between an object carousel and a service domain except for the terminology: an object carousel is a service domain, and vice versa.

== Usage and applications ==
Data and object carousels are most commonly used in DVB, which has standards for broadcasting digital television content using carousels. The standard format for a carousel is defined in the Digital Storage Media Command and Control (DSM-CC) toolkit in ISO/IEC 13818-6 and is part of the Digital Audio Video Council (DAVIC) DVB standard for digital video broadcasting. The specification provides support for a variety of communication models, including provision for interactive transport control of audio and video streams in a bi-directional environment such as a cable television video on demand system.

The DSM-CC standard specifies two types of carousels, a data carousel and an object carousel. The object carousel extends the more limited data carousel and specifies a standard format for representing a file system directory structure comprising a root directory or service gateway and one or more files and directories.

Files and directories are encapsulated in a DSM-CC object carousel in several layers. Objects are encapsulated in modules, which are carried within download data blocks, within DSM-CC sections encoded in MPEG private sections which are assembled from packets.

== Carousel management ==
Carousel complexity can increase dramatically based on various factors such as the content type or the content filling algorithm. Generally the content of a transmission carousel is dynamic, based on a multitude of variables, such as duration of the carousel transmission, and is either determined by some type of algorithm or management utility.

Concepts such as embedded carousels are well-known and in use. This is when the main transmission carousel has a particular piece of content dynamically changing itself based on a sub-carousel content provider.

== See also ==
- DSM-CC (digital storage media command and control)
- DVB (digital video broadcasting)
- DVB-C (digital video broadcasting – cable)
