= Delivery Multimedia Integration Framework =

Uniform interface between the application and the transport

DMIF, or Delivery Multimedia Integration Framework, is a uniform interface between the application and the transport, that allows the MPEG-4 application developer to stop worrying about that transport. DMIF was defined in MPEG-4 Part 6 (ISO/IEC 14496-6) in 1999. DMIF defines two interfaces: the DAI (DMIF/Application Interface) and the DNI (DMIF-Network Interface). A single application can run on different transport layers when supported by the right DMIF instantiation. MPEG-4 DMIF supports the following functionalities:

- A transparent MPEG-4 DMIF-application interface irrespective of whether the peer is a remote interactive peer, broadcast or local storage media.
- Control of the establishment of FlexMux channels
- Use of homogeneous networks between interactive peers: IP, ATM, mobile, PSTN, narrowband ISDN.
- Support for mobile networks, developed together with ITU-T
- UserCommands with acknowledgment messages.
- Management of MPEG-4 Sync Layer information

DMIF expands upon the MPEG-2 DSM-CC standard (ISO/IEC 13818-6:1998) to enable the convergence of interactive, broadcast and conversational multimedia into one specification which will be applicable to set tops, desktops and mobile stations. The DSM-CC work was extended as part of the ISO/IEC 14496-6, with the DSM-CC Multimedia Integration Framework (DMIF). DSM-CC stands for Digital Storage Media - Command and Control. DMIF was also a name of working group within Moving Picture Experts Group. The acronym "DSM-CC" was replaced by "Delivery" (Delivery Multimedia Integration Framework) in 1997.
