= MPEG-4 Part 20 =

MPEG-4 Part 20, or MPEG-4 Lightweight Application Scene Representation (LASeR) is a rich media standard dedicated to the mobile, embedded and consumer electronics industries specified by the MPEG standardization group. LASeR is based on SVG Tiny and adds methods for sending dynamic updates and a binary compression format.

The ISO document defining LASeR is ISO 14496-20, Lightweight Application Scene Representation (LASeR) and Simple Aggregation Format (SAF).

== Introduction ==
MPEG-4 Part 20 is a specification designed for representing and delivering rich-media services to resource-constrained devices such as mobile phones. It defines two binary formats: LASeR, Lightweight Application Scene Representation, a binary format for encoding 2D scenes, including vector graphics, and timed modifications of the scene; and SAF, Simple Aggregation Format, a binary format for aggregating in a single stream LASeR content with audio/video streams.

== LASeR, a binary format for representing rich-media services content ==
The LASeR specification has been designed to allow the efficient representation of 2D scenes describing rich-media services for constraint devices. A rich-media service is a dynamic and interactive presentation comprising 2D vector graphics, images, text and audiovisual material. The representation of such a presentation includes describing the spatial and temporal organization of its different elements as well as its possible interactions and animations.

MPEG evaluated the state-of-art technologies in the field of composition coding. Seeing that none were satisfactory for constraint devices like mobiles phones, MPEG decided to create the LASeR standard. The LASeR requirements included compression efficiency, code and memory footprint. The LASeR standard fulfills these requirements by building upon the existing Scalable Vector Graphics (SVG) format defined by the World Wide Web Consortium and particularly on its Tiny profile already adopted in the mobile industry. LASeR complements SVG by defining a small set of compatible key extensions tuned according to the requirements. These key extensions permit among others: the frame-accurate synchronization of the scene with the audio-visual elements, the streaming and efficient compression of SVG content.

The streaming capability of LASeR is a benefit of the concept of LASeR stream, inspired from the MPEG-4 BIFS standard. A LASeR stream is the concatenation of an initial scene and the timed modifications of it, which can be sent in a streaming mode from a server to a client in a timed manner.

Efficient compression improves delivery and decoding times, as well as storage size and is achieved by a compact binary representation of the SVG scene tree. This compact representation is tailored for the efficient compression of SVG content. Specific encoding techniques have been designed for simple yet efficient encoding of SVG specific data.

== SAF, the aggregation of LASeR and audiovisual material ==
The delivery of Rich Media content to constraint devices is a challenging task which consists in delivering the representation of the presentation along with all the audiovisual material used in it. Efficient delivery, especially on mobile low bandwidth networks, requires reactivity and fluidity.

The SAF specification defines tools to enable the transport of LASeR content along with its attached audiovisual material according to these requirements. The SAF specification defines a binary format for a SAF stream, made of a LASeR stream with any type of media stream. SAF streams are low overhead multiplexed streams which can be successfully delivered using any delivery mechanism: download-and-play, progressive download, streaming or broadcasting. To achieve reactivity, the SAF specification defines the concept of cache unit which allows sending in advance sub-content which will be used later on in the presentation.

SAF streams may be:

- packaged in RTP/RSTP (payload format defined in RFC 3640)
- packaged in MP4/3GP files (mapping defined with SAF)
- packaged in MPEG-2 Transport Stream (the SL mapping defined in ISO/IEC 14496-8)

== Target applications ==
Mobile interactive portals, Mobile TV (over 3G, DVB-H, DMB, …), 2D cartoons, interactive vector graphics maps, 2D widgets, etc.
