= Microsoft Video 1 =

Video codec by Microsoft

Microsoft Video 1 (Note: It was known internally to Microsoft as MS-CRAM.) is an early lossy video compression and decompression algorithm (codec) that was released with version 1.0 of Microsoft's Video for Windows in November 1992. It is based on MotiVE, a vector quantization codec which Microsoft licensed from Media Vision.

== Compression algorithm ==
Microsoft Video 1 uses vector quantization to compress the video in a lossy manner. Key frames may be set at variable intervals, from a minimum of every 15 frames, in order to achieve compression ratios of 10:1 to up to 100:1. It operates either in an 8-bit palettized color space or in a 15-bit RGB color space. Each frame is split into 4×4 pixel blocks, which can be coded in one of three modes: skip, 2-color or 8-color. In skip mode, the content from the previous frame is copied to the current frame in a conditional replenishment fashion. In 2-color mode, two colors per 4×4 block are transmitted, and 1 bit per pixel is used to select between the two colors. In 8-color mode, the same scheme applies with 2 colors per 2×2 block. This can be interpreted as a 2-color palette which is locally adapted on either a 4×4 block basis or a 2×2 block basis. Interpreted as vector quantization, vectors with components red, green, and blue are quantized using a forward adaptive codebook with two entries.

== Hardware implementation ==
Initially a software-only codec, in 1993 Media Vision released a hardware implementation of Microsoft Video 1 for use in capture cards in the form of two ASICs: the MVV251 and the MVV351. The MVV251 was responsible for capturing analog video, while the MVV351 compressed it using the Microsoft Video 1 codec in 16-bit mode, performing this compression on-die. The company later marketed the Pro Movie Spectrum, an ISA board that captured video in both raw and Microsoft Video 1 formats, with the Microsoft Video 1 processing done in hardware on the board.

== Reception ==
Microsoft Video 1 received widespread use among multimedia PC users in the early 1990s. Its early momentum was helped by the fact it was the only codec shipped with the initial version of Video for Windows in 1992 besides Intel's Indeo and Microsoft's RLE codec; both produced much larger video files than Video 1, and Indeo was much harder to decode on entry-level multimedia PCs. In addition to shrinking the file size further, its 8-bit mode was also useful for contemporary low-end video hardware, which struggled playing back video files in 24-bit color in real time. As the decade progressed and CPUs became fast enough for advanced codecs such as Cinepak (the license for which Microsoft acquired for its second release of Video for Windows), Microsoft Video 1 became criticized for its prominent macroblocking artifacts which resulted in distorted video. By the early 2000s, Microsoft Video 1 was considered archaic by technology professionals.

== See also ==
- Indexed color
- Color quantization
- Block truncation coding, a similar coding technique for grayscale content
- Color Cell Compression, a similar coding technique for color content, based on block truncation coding
- Apple Video, a codec based on a similar design
- QuickTime Graphics, a codec based on a similar design
- Smacker video, a codec based on a similar design
- S3 Texture Compression, a texture compression format based on a similar design
