= CVID =

CVID may refer to:

- Common variable immunodeficiency
- Complete, Verifiable and Irreversible Dismantlement of North Korea's nuclear program, or,
  - Complete, Verifiable and Irreversible Denuclearization of North Korea's nuclear program
- The FourCC identifier for the video codec Cinepak, formerly called Compact Video
