= Full-motion video =

Video game narration technique

Full-motion video (FMV) is a video game narration technique that relies upon pre-recorded video files (rather than sprites, vectors, or 3D models) to display action in the game. While many games feature FMVs as a way to present information during cutscenes, games that are primarily presented through FMVs are referred to as full-motion video games or interactive movies. Recent full motion video games often combine the use of CGI/green screens and in-game graphics for immersion.

The early 1980s saw almost exclusive use of the LaserDisc for FMV games. Many arcade games used the technology but it was ultimately considered to be a fad and fell out of use. In the early 1990s FMV games had a resurgence of interest, the proliferation of optical discs gave rise to a slew of original FMV-based computer games such as Night Trap (1992), The 7th Guest (1993), Voyeur (1993), Phantasmagoria (1995), and Daryl F. Gates' Police Quest: SWAT (1995). The introduction of CD-based consoles like 3DO, CD-i, and Sega CD brought the concept of interactive FMV gameplay. Companies such as Digital Pictures and American Laser Games were formed to produce full-motion video games.

As the video game industry was emerging from its niche status into the mainstream—by 1994 it was two-and-a-half times larger than Hollywood by revenue—Hollywood began to make inroads into the growing market. In 1994, Sony's Johnny Mnemonic became the first video game title produced by a film studio. Soon thereafter, video game heavyweight Electronic Arts featured well-known Hollywood talent such as Mark Hamill, Tom Wilson and John Spencer in their critically acclaimed titles Wing Commander III and IV, setting the stage for a more expansive tie-up between the movie and video game industries. With the continual improvement of in-game CGI, FMV as a major gameplay component had eventually disappeared because of the limited gameplay options it allowed.

== Arcades ==
The first wave of FMV games originated in arcades in 1983 with laserdisc video games, notably Astron Belt from Sega and Dragon's Lair from Cinematronics. They used Laserdiscs to store the video used in the game, which allowed for very high quality visuals compared to contemporary arcade games of the era. A number of arcade games using FMV with Laserdiscs were released over the next three years and the technology was touted as the future of video games. Some games released in this era reused video footage from other sources while others had it purpose made. Bega's Battle, Cliff Hanger and Firefox reused footage, while titles like Space Ace, Time Gal, Thayer's Quest, Super Don Quix-ote and Cobra Command were entirely original.

The use of pre-rendered 3D computer graphics for video sequences also date back to two arcade laserdisc games introduced in 1983: Interstellar, introduced by Funai at the AM Show in September, and Star Rider, introduced by Williams Electronics at the AMOA show in October.

The limited nature of FMV, high price to play (50 cents in an era where 25 cents was standard), high cost of the hardware and problems with reliability quickly took its toll on the buzz surrounding these games and their popularity diminished. By 1985, the allure of FMV and the Laserdisc had worn off, and the technology had disappeared from arcades by the end of 1987. RDI Video Systems (Thayer's Quest) had branched out into making a home console called the Halcyon, but it failed and they went bankrupt. Cinematronics's fortunes fared little better and they were bought out by Tradewest in 1987. Companies such as Atari canceled more prototype Laserdisc games than they released. Others, like Universal, stopped development on games after only one release despite announcing several titles.

After only a few years, the technology had improved and Laserdisc players were more reliable. In addition, costs had come down and the average price to play a game had gone up. These factors caused a resurgence of the popularity of Laserdiscs games in the arcade. American Laser Games released a light gun shooting game called Mad Dog McCree in 1990, which was an instant hit. Then, in 1991 with Who Shot Johnny Rock?, American Laser alone would go on to lease almost a dozen Laserdisc games over the next few years and many other companies again rushed to release titles using the technology. Dragon's Lair II, a title which had been shelved years earlier, was released by Leland to strong sales. Time Traveler further pushed the technology by using special projection technology to give the appearance of 3D visuals.

Again, the fad passed quickly. The limited nature of the Laserdisc hampered interactivity and limited replayability, a key weakness in arcade games. American Laser, the chief producer of Laserdisc games during this era, had stopped making arcade games in 1994 and most other companies switched over to newer technologies around the same time. With the rise of 3D graphics and the introduction of hard drives and CD-ROMs to arcades, the large, expensive and small-capacity Laserdisc could not compete and disappeared. While CDs would see some use in the mid and late 1990s, it was hard drives, GD-ROMs and DVD-ROMs that caused the largest jump in FMV use in the arcade. Their very large capacities and mature, reliable technology allowed for much cheaper hardware than traditional hardware systems, and FMV cut-scenes became commonplace. FMV as a major gameplay component had disappeared by this time because of the limited gameplay options it allowed.

== Home systems ==
Between 1984 and 1987, a number of laserdisc games were released for the MSX computer in Japan, including ports of arcade games. In 1985, a home console system called the Halcyon was released by RDI Video Systems that used Laserdiscs for its games and was to feature ports of several popular Laserdisc arcade games of the day. It used FMV exclusively, but the company folded after releasing only two titles for the system. The LaserActive from Pioneer would try the technology again in 1994, but it too failed.

By the early 1990s when PCs and consoles moved to creating games on a CD, they became technically capable of utilizing more than a few minutes' worth of movies in a game. This gave rise to a slew of original FMV-based computer games such as Night Trap (1992), The 7th Guest (1993), Voyeur (1993), Phantasmagoria (1995), and Daryl F. Gates' Police Quest: SWAT (1995). Other titles were simply scaled down ports of Laserdisc arcade games, some of them a decade old by this time. Regardless of their sources, these FMV games frequently used B-movie and TV actors and promised to create the experience of playing an interactive movie or animation. However, production values were quite low with amateurish sets, lighting, costumes, and special effects. Animated titles either cobbled together footage from old anime or used cheaper overseas animation producers to create their footage. In addition, the video quality in these early games was low, and the gameplay frequently did not live up to the hype becoming well-known failures in video gaming. At this time, consoles like 3DO, CD-i, and Sega CD borrowed this concept for several low-quality interactive games. Companies such as Digital Pictures and American Laser Games were formed to produce full-motion video games.

Also, the "multimedia" phenomenon that was exploding in popularity at the time increased the popularity of FMV because consumers were excited by this new emerging interactive technology. The personal computer was rapidly evolving during the early-to-mid 1990s from a simple text-based productivity device into a home entertainment machine. Gaming itself was also emerging from its niche market into the mainstream with the release of easier-to-use and more powerful operating systems, such as Microsoft's Windows 95, that leveraged continually evolving processing capabilities. Some games like the Tex Murphy series combined FMV cutscenes with a virtual world to explore.

Video game consoles too saw incredible gains in presentation quality and contributed to the mass market's growth in awareness of gaming. It was during the 1990s that the video/computer game industry first beat Hollywood in earnings. Sony made its debut in the console market with the release of the 32-bit PlayStation. The PlayStation was probably the first console to popularize FMVs (as opposed to earlier usage of FMV which was seen as a passing fad). A part of the machine's hardware was a dedicated M-JPEG processing unit which enabled far superior quality relative to other platforms of the time. The FMVs in Final Fantasy VIII, for example, were marketed as movie-quality at the time.

FMVs in games today typically consist of high-quality pre-rendered video sequences (CGI). These sequences are created in similar ways as computer generated effects in movies. Use of FMV as a selling point or focus has diminished in modern times. This is primarily due to graphical advancements in modern video game systems making it possible for in-game cinematics to have just as impressive visual quality. Digitized video footage of real actors in games generally ended for mainstream games in the early 2000s with a few exceptions such as Ace Combat Zero: The Belkan War released in 2006, Command & Conquer 3: Tiberium Wars released in 2007, Tesla Effect: A Tex Murphy Adventure released in 2014, Her Story and Guitar Hero Live released in 2015, the 2015 reboot of Need for Speed, and Obduction released in 2016.

== Formats ==
The early 1980s saw the almost exclusive use of the Laserdisc for FMV games. Many arcade games used the technology but it was ultimately considered a fad and fell out of use. At least one arcade game, NFL Football from Bally/Midway, used CEDs to play its video. Some 1970s era Nintendo games used film and projectors. formats had the advantage of offering full frame video and sound without the quality problems of compressed video that would plague later formats like CDs.

With the re-popularization of FMV games in the early 1990s following the advent of CD-ROM, higher-end developers usually created their own custom FMV formats to suit their needs. Early FMV titles used game-specific proprietary video renderers optimized for the content of the video (e.g., live-action vs. animated), because CPUs of the day were incapable of playing back real-time MPEG-1 until the fastest 486 and Pentium CPUs arrived. Consoles, on the other hand, either used a third-party codec (e.g., Cinepak for Sega CD games) or used their own proprietary format (e.g. the Philips CD-i). Video quality steadily increased as CPUs became more powerful to support higher quality video compression and decompression. The 7th Guest, one of the first megahit multiple-CD-ROM games, was one of the first games to feature transparent quality 640x320 FMV at 15 frames per second in a custom format designed by programmer Graeme Devine.

Other examples of this would be Sierra's VMD (Video and Music Data) format, used in games like Gabriel Knight 2 and Phantasmagoria, or Westwood Studios' VQA format, used in most Westwood games made from the mid-1990s up until 2000s Command & Conquer: Tiberian Sun Firestorm. These video formats initially offered very limited video quality, due to the limitations of the machines the games needed to run on. Ghosting and distortion of high-motion scenes, heavy pixelization, and limited color palettes were prominent visual problems. However, each game pushed the technological envelope and was typically seen as impressive even with quality issues.

Johnny Mnemonic: The Interactive Action Movie, was the first FMV title made by a Hollywood studio. Sony Imagesoft spent over $3 million on the title. Instead of piecing together the title with filmed assets from their movie (directed by Robert Longo) of the same name, Sony hired Propaganda Code director Douglas Gayeton to write and film an entirely new storyline for the property. The CD-ROM's interactivity was made possible with the Cine-Active engine, based on the QuickTime 2.0 codec.

Wing Commander III: Heart of the Tiger was one of the most significant FMV titles made in 1994, featuring big-name Hollywood actors. The video quality in the game suffered significantly from the aforementioned problems and was almost visually indecipherable in parts; however, this did not stop the title from earning significant praise for its innovative gameplay/FMV combination. Its sequel, Wing Commander IV: The Price of Freedom, used a similar custom movie codec in its CD-ROM release, but a later limited-volume DVD-ROM release saw MPEG-2 DVD-quality movies that far exceeded the original CD release in quality. A hardware decoder card was required at the time to play back the DVD-quality video on a PC. Wing Commander IV was also the first game to have used actual film (rather than video tape) to record the FMV scenes which attributed to the ability to create a DVD-quality transfer.

An exception to the rule was The 11th Hour, the sequel to The 7th Guest. 11th Hour featured 640×480 FMV at 30 frames-per-second on 4 CDs. The development team had worked for three years on developing a format that could handle the video, as the director of the live-action sequences had not shot the FMV sequences in a way that could be easily compressed. However, this proved to be the game's downfall, as most computers of the day could not play the full-resolution video. Users were usually forced to select an option which played the videos at a quarter-size resolution in black-and-white.

As FMV established itself in the market as a growing game technology, a small company called RAD Game Tools appeared on the market with their 256-color FMV format Smacker. Developers took to the format, and the format ended up being used in over 3,000, largely PC-based games.

With the launch of consoles with built-in optical storage (the Sega Saturn and Sony's PlayStation) console manufacturers began more actively taking it upon themselves to provide higher quality FMV capabilities to developers. Sony included optimizations in their hardware for their MDEC (motion decompression) technology, and Sega chose the software route. Sega worked both internally on optimizing technology such as Cinepak, and externally by licensing video decompression technology from the New York-based Duck Corporation. While Duck's offering won praise for its quality (showcased in games like Enemy Zero, major Launch titles in the US and the Saturn adaptations of console hits from the Sega AM2 arcade group) the opaque licensing and royalty structure impeded widespread adoption outside of Japanese and larger US developers.

Duck's TrueMotion technology was extended to the PC and Macintosh as well, showcased in the high-profile Star Trek: Borg and Star Trek: Klingon, The X-Files Game, Final Fantasy VII, and the highly anticipated sequel to Phantasmagoria, Phantasmagoria: A Puzzle of Flesh and other titles. It was reported that versions for PlayStation and GameCube were developed, but the last console version released was for Sega's short-lived Dreamcast.

As the popularity of games loaded with live-action and FMV faded out in the late 1990s, and with Smacker becoming outdated in the world of 16-bit color games, RAD introduced a new true-color format, Bink video. Developers quickly took to the format because of its high compression ratios and videogame-tailored features. The format is still one of the most popular FMV formats used in games today. 4,000 games have used Bink, and the number is still growing.

In the late '90s, Duck largely shelved its support for the console market (likely fueled by the direct support for DVD support in newer generation consoles) and focused its formats instead on internet delivered video. Duck went public as On2 Technologies and later generations of its technology was licensed by Adobe, Skype and was eventually bought (along with the company) by Google as the foundation for WebM. An early open source version of that work also appears as the renamed Theora codec of the Xiph Project.

Windows Media Video, DivX, Flash Video, Theora and WebM are also now major players in the market. DivX is used in several GameCube games, including Star Wars Rogue Squadron III: Rebel Strike.

== See also ==
- List of interactive movies
- Interactive movie
- Motion JPEG
- Cinepak
- MPEG-1
- Smacker video
- TrueMotion
- Bink Video
