= Windows Media Components for QuickTime =

MacOS media plugin

Flip4Mac - Windows Media Components for QuickTime
- Flip4Mac WMV Preference Pane
- Developer: Telestream, Inc.
- Final release: 3.3.8 (latest version for Mac OS X 10.6.8 through Mac OS 10.11.6); 3.2.0.16 (last free version for Mac OS X 10.6.8 through 10.11.6.); 2.4.4.2 (last supported version for Mac OS X 10.5 and Mac OS X 10.6) / May 2015
- Operating system: macOS
- Platform: IA-32, x64
- Type: Multimedia framework Plug-in; Media player
- License: Commercial software (from v3.3); Freeware (until v3.2)
- Website: www.telestream.net/flip4mac/download.htm

Windows Media Components for QuickTime, also known as Flip4Mac WMV Player by Telestream, Inc. was one of the few commercial products that allow playback of Microsoft's proprietary audio and video codecs inside QuickTime for macOS.

It allowed playback of:

- Windows Media Video 7, 8, 9, SD and HD
- Windows Media Audio 7, 8, 9, Professional and Lossless

It also included a web browser plug-in to allow playback of embedded Windows Media files in web pages.

With the components installed, any QuickTime-compatible application is able to directly play WMV content. This includes the official QuickTime Player by Apple as well as countless third party players. WMV Player also allows Windows media files to be associated to QuickTime Player.

On January 12, 2006, Microsoft discontinued support for Windows Media Player for Mac OS X and began distributing a free version of WMV Player as Windows Media Components for QuickTime on their website. As of June 2015, there is no longer a free version of this application offered. Flip4Mac was retired as of July 1, 2019. "If you are a current user of Flip4Mac, or your Flip4Mac stopped functioning when up upgraded your operating system, we invite you to take a look at Switch."

== Timeline ==
- July 8, 2006 – Flip4Mac did not officially run on Intel-based Macs.
- July 15, 2006 – version 2.1 of Flip4Mac now supported Windows Media Player 10 content, which was previously inaccessible to Macintosh users. This newer version also supports Intel-based Macs.
- July 27, 2006 – version 2.1 is a non-beta release of the Universal Binary format for Mac OS X.
- September 20, 2016 - Flip4Mac doesn't work in macOS Sierra (10.12)
- July 1, 2019 - Flip4Mac officially discontinued by Telestream (Telestream had stopped development as of 2016)

== See also ==
- Flip4Mac
- Perian
- VLC media player, an alternative open source player
- Xiph QuickTime Components
