= Road pizza =

Road pizza can refer to:

- Roadkill
- Apple Video codec, character code RPZA, introduced in early versions of QuickTime
