= Live Law =

Legal digital news portal in India

Live Law (stylized as LiveLaw or livelaw.in) is an Indian digital legal news portal and media platform that provides real-time coverage of court proceedings, judgments, legal developments, and related news primarily from the Supreme Court of India and various High Courts in Hindi and English. Launched in 2013, it has become one of India's most prominent and trusted sources for legal journalism, known for fact-based reporting, accessible summaries of complex court orders, daily and weekly round-ups, and expert analysis. The platform targets lawyers, judges, law students, law firms, academicians, and the general public interested in the Indian legal system.

Live Law claims to be a comprehensive legal news portal committed to provide accurate and honest news about legal developments. The legal news portal has also been cited in unrelated cases before various High Courts, including the Hon'ble Karnataka High Court, by lawyers appearing for their respective clients, indicating its notability in the legal fraternity. The portal's editorial policy claims that Live Law is committed to the ideals of the Constitution and is an Independent Media, engaged in fact-based, non-sensational journalism. It is the most economical source of paid all India legal digests.
