= Perian =

Plugin for Apple QuickTime, 2006–2011

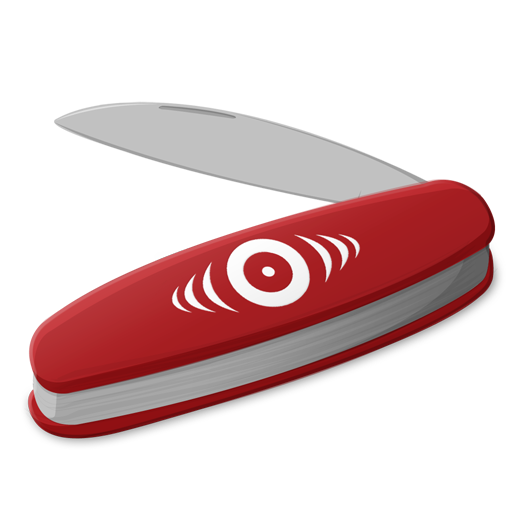
- Developer: The Perian Team
- Release: 29 September 2006
- Final release: 1.2.3 / 23 July 2011; 15 years ago
- Operating system: macOS 10.4.7 or later
- Platform: PPC, Intel
- Type: Multimedia framework plug-in
- License: LGPL
- Website: www.perian.org

Perian was an open-source QuickTime component that enabled Apple Inc.’s QuickTime to play several popular video formats not supported natively by QuickTime on macOS. It was a joint development of several earlier open source components based on the multiplatform FFmpeg project's libavcodec and libavformat, as well as liba52 and libmatroska.

Before it was discontinued, it was featured as the "Download of the Day" on Lifehacker, as well as on several popular blogs including Ars Technica and The Unofficial Apple Weblog.

== Project shutdown ==
On 15 May 2012, the Perian project managers announced on their website that they were shutting down support for the project. In the announcement, they recommended that users look to other products, such as Niceplayer, VLC or MPlayer OS X. They indicated that Perian's source code would be posted online for any developer who wanted to continue with the project. One continuation based on the source code is actively maintained but does not support QuickTime for OS X Mavericks or later.

== Supported formats ==
Perian lent support for many combinations of video, audio, text, and container formats to QuickTime, including the following:

AV codec support for the following:

- MPEG-4 Part 2
- MS-MPEG4 v1, v2 and v3
- H.263
- H.264
- Flash Screen Video
- Truemotion VP6 & VP3
- HuffYUV
- Xiph Vorbis (in Matroska)
- Snow wavelet video
- DOSBox video
- DTS Coherent Acoustics audio
- Nellymoser Asao Codec
- Windows Media Audio (WMA) v1 & v21
- Dolby Digital
- Fraps
- Indeo 2, 3 and 5
- WebM/VP8
- FFV1
- Theora

Subtitle support for the following:

- (Advanced) SubStation Alpha
- SRT
- SAMI
- VobSub

Container format support for the following:

- FLV file format
- NUV file format
- Matroska (MKV)

== See also ==
- Windows Media Components for QuickTime
- Xiph QuickTime Components
- Combined Community Codec Pack (a similar bundle for Windows)
