= AVFoundation =

Audiovisual asset and device control API by Apple Inc

AVFoundation is a multimedia framework with APIs in Objective-C and Swift, which provides high-level services for working with time-based audiovisual media on Apple Darwin-based operating systems: iOS, macOS, tvOS, and watchOS. It was first introduced in iOS 4 and has seen significant changes in iOS 5 and iOS 6. Starting with Mac OS X Lion, it is now the default media framework for the macOS platform.

== AVKit ==
As a component of AVFoundation, AVKit is an API that comes with OS X Mavericks 10.9+ and can be used with Xcode 5.0+ for developing media player software for Mac.

The AVKit software framework is replacing QTKit which was deprecated in OS X Mavericks, and was discontinued with the release of macOS Catalina.

== See also ==
- QuickTime
- Media Foundation
