= San Francisco Canyon Company =

San Francisco Canyon Company, Inc., was a software development company active from 1988 to 1998 that Apple Computer, Intel, and Microsoft contracted in 1990s to improve the performance of QuickTime and Video for Windows.

San Francisco Canyon was contracted by Apple in 1992 to port the QuickTime technology to Microsoft Windows. The resulting QuickTime for Windows was first released in November 1992.

In July 1993, Intel contracted the same company to improve the performance of Microsoft's Video for Windows technology on Intel CPUs. By the end of 1993, Intel and Microsoft had jointly created the Display Control Interface (DCI) driver that was included in Video for Windows 1.1d (released in late 1994). As with WinG, the main problem DCI fixed was that Windows 3.x video drivers, which implemented all GDI routines for drawing bitmaps, had varied (and often suboptimal) performance.

The "Apple Computer v. San Francisco Canyon Co." lawsuit, filed on December 6, 1994, alleged that San Francisco Canyon used thousands of lines of the code developed under contract to Apple in their additions to Video for Windows. Apple expanded the lawsuit to include Intel and Microsoft on February 10, 1995, alleging that Microsoft and Intel knowingly used the software company to aid them in stealing QuickTime code.

On March 3, 1995, a federal judge issued a temporary restraining order that prohibited Microsoft from distributing version 1.1d of Video for Windows. Microsoft subsequently released version 1.1e devoid of San Francisco Canyon's contributions, stating in the release notes "does not include the low-level driver code that was licensed from Intel Corporation".

Later testimony in the United States v. Microsoft Corp. case revealed that, at the time, Apple was threatening Microsoft with a multibillion-dollar lawsuit over the allegedly stolen code, and in return Bill Gates was threatening the cancellation of Microsoft Office for Mac. In August 1997, Apple and Microsoft announced a settlement deal. Apple dropped all standing lawsuits, including all lingering issues from the "Look & Feel" lawsuit and the mentioned QuickTime lawsuit, and agreed to make Internet Explorer for Mac the default browser on the Macintosh unless the user explicitly chose the bundled Netscape browser. In return, Microsoft agreed to continue developing Office, Internet Explorer, and various developer tools and software for the Mac for the next 5 years, and purchase $150 million of non-voting Apple stock. The companies also agreed to mutual collaboration on Java technologies, and to cross-license all existing patents, and patents obtained during the five-year deal, with one another.
