= ActiveMovie =

Digital media player software for Microsoft Windows

ActiveMovie Control running on Windows 2000

ActiveMovie was the immediate ancestor of Windows Media Player 6.x, and was a streaming media technology now known as DirectShow, developed by Microsoft to replace Video for Windows. ActiveMovie allows users to view media streams, whether distributed via the Internet, an intranet or CD-ROMs.

Originally announced in March 1996, the first version was released in May 1996 bundled with the beta version of Internet Explorer 3.0.

When ActiveMovie was installed an option was added to the Start Menu to launch the ActiveMovie Control. This allowed users to play multimedia files and thus was a rudimentary media player.

In March 1997, Microsoft announced that ActiveMovie was going to become part of the DirectX set of technologies, and by July it was being referred to as DirectShow.

Version 5.2 of Windows Media Player would remove the ActiveMovie Control icon from the Start Menu upon installation. Microsoft provided instructions for reinstalling the icon on its website.

== See also ==
- ChromEffects
- Windows Media Player
