= Video for Windows =

Video-playing suite introduced in Windows 3.1

Video for Windows is a discontinued suite of video-playing and editing software introduced by Microsoft in 1992. A runtime version for viewing videos only was made available as a free add-on to Windows 3.1, which then became an integral component of Windows 95. Video for Windows was mostly replaced by the July 1996 release of ActiveMovie, later known as DirectShow.

== Overview ==
Video for Windows was first introduced in November 1992. It was developed as a reaction to Apple Computer's QuickTime technology, which added digital video to the Macintosh platform. Costing around $200, the product included editing and encoding programs for use with video input boards. A runtime version for viewing videos only was also made available as a free add-on to Windows 3.1 and Windows 3.11; it then became an integral component of Windows 95 and later.

Like QuickTime, Video for Windows had three key aspects: Audio Video Interleave (AVI), a container file format designed to store digital video; an application programming interface (API) that allowed software developers to play or manipulate digital video in their own applications; a suite of software for playing and editing digital video. VfW software suite consisted of:

- Media Player
- VidCap
- VidEdit
- BitEdit
- PalEdit
- WaveEdit

The original version was limited to a maximum resolution of 320 pixels by 240 pixels and a maximum image rate of 30 frames per second.

Video for Windows was mostly replaced by the July 1996 release of ActiveMovie, later known as DirectShow. It was first released as a beta version along with the second beta of Internet Explorer 3. ActiveMovie was released as a free download, either standalone or bundled with Internet Explorer. ActiveMovie, however, did not support video capture. Video for Windows was still used for video capture until the release of Windows Driver Model capture drivers, which only started to become popular in 2000.

Video for Windows became an issue in a lawsuit Apple filed in December 1994 against San Francisco Canyon Company and in 1995 against Microsoft and Intel alleging theft of several thousand lines of QuickTime source code to improve the performance of Video for Windows. This lawsuit was ultimately settled in 1997, when Apple agreed to make Internet Explorer the default browser over Netscape; in exchange, Microsoft agreed to continue developing Microsoft Office and other software for Mac OS for the next 5 years, and purchase $150 million of non-voting Apple stock.

In March 1997, Microsoft announced that ActiveMovie would become part of DirectX 5, and around July started referring to it as DirectShow.

== Version history ==
Release date	Version	Description
November 1992	Video for Windows 1.0	First public release. Including Microsoft RLE and Video1 (CRAM, only pal8 supported) and Intel Indeo v2.1 codecs. Works, except for the Indeo codec, on 16-bit 286 CPUs.
November 1993	Video for Windows 1.1	Added Cinepak codec and requires 32-bit 386 CPUs or better. Five updates were released for this version: 1.1a through 1.1e, with the last one (published in March 1995) being the last version for Windows 3.1x. 1.1d included Indeo 3.2 codec (which Apple alleged to have infringed on the source code from Apple's QuickTime for Windows).
September 1994	Video for Windows NT	Bundled with Windows NT 3.5 and later
August 1995	Video for Windows 95	Bundled with Windows 95
July 1996	ActiveMovie 1.0	The successor of Video for Windows. Added support for MPEG-1 and QuickTime file formats.
March 1997	DirectShow 1.0	The successor of ActiveMovie.

== See also ==
- QuickTime
- Media Control Interface
