= Miles Sound System =

Sound software development kit for video games

- Original author: John Miles
- Developer: Epic Games Tools
- Release: 1991; 35 years ago
- Stable release: 10.0.62.0 / March 4, 2022; 4 years ago
- Operating system: DOS, Windows, Linux, Classic Mac OS, macOS, Xbox, Xbox 360, Xbox One, PlayStation 2, PlayStation 3, PlayStation 4, PlayStation Portable, PlayStation Vita, Wii, Wii U, Nintendo Switch, Nintendo 3DS, Android, iOS, Windows Phone
- Type: Application programming interface (API)
- Website: www.radgametools.com/miles.htm

Miles Sound System (MSS), formerly known as Audio Interface Library (AIL), is a sound software system primarily for video games and used mostly as an alternative for low-end audio chipsets. It uses little CPU time while providing adequate audio output. It was originally a middleware driver library for soundcards to use in DOS applications when no viable alternative was available. RAD Game Tools (now Epic Games Tools) acquired the technology from Miles Design in 1995.

The 1992 AIL version 2 for DOS has been released by John Miles as open-source (public domain without restrictions) in 2000. The package can be found on his personal site (KE5FX.com) and contains source code for both real-mode and protected-mode programs.

== Reception ==
The Miles Sound System was used in its history by over 7,000 video games across 18 platforms, with customers including Sony, Capcom, Epic, and Microsoft. Computer Gaming World stated in 1994 that "Many of the game publishers have decided to support only those sound cards which are supported by the Miles drivers", especially the Sound Blaster.
