= Pixlet =

Video codec

Pixlet is a video codec created by Apple and based on wavelets, designed to enable viewing of full-resolution, HD movies in real time at low DV data rates. According to Apple's claims, it allows for a 20–25:1 compression ratio. Similar to DV, it does not use interframe compression, making it suitable for previewing in production and special effects studios. It is designed to be an editing codec; however, low bitrates make it poorly suited to broadcast use.

The name Pixlet is a contraction of 'Pixar wavelet'. When it was introduced by Steve Jobs at Worldwide Developers Conference 2003, it was said that the codec was developed at the request of animation company Pixar.

A Power Macintosh with at least a 1 GHz PowerPC G4 processor is required for real-time playback of half-resolution high-definition video (960x540).

Pixlet, while part of the cross-platform QuickTime, is only available on Macs running Mac OS X v10.3 or later. QuickTime X cannot decode Pixlet files.

FFmpeg version 3.3 and later can decode Pixlet files. On March 21, 2019, Apple announced that Pixlet is among the codecs that will no longer be supported in its own software after the successor to macOS Mojave is released, due to the transition to 64-bit-only software. In the same announcement, Apple noted that third-party developers could maintain support by building support directly into their apps.
