= S2TC =

Texture compression algorithm

S2TC (short for Super Simple Texture Compression) is a texture compression algorithm based on Color Cell Compression. It is designed to be compatible with existing patented S3TC decompressors while avoiding any need for patent licensing fees.

According to the authors, compressed textures produced by a good S2TC implementation are similar in quality to compressed textures produced by a bad S3TC implementation. The S2TC reference implementation is also capable of decompressing S3TC compressed textures, but instead of implementing the patented aspects of the algorithm, the S2TC decompressor picks colors at random. S2TC was created to provide an alternative to S3TC for open-source OpenGL implementations which were legally constrained from implementing patented algorithms.

Note, the patent expired on October 2, 2017. S3TC support has landed in Mesa since then.
