= Bink Video =

Proprietary video format

- Bink logo
- Filename extension: .bik, .bk2, .bik2
- Internet media type: video/vnd.radgametools.bink
- Developed by: Epic Games Tools
- Initial release: March 22, 1999; 27 years ago
- Latest release: 2025.05; October 3, 2025; 13 months ago
- Type of format: Video file
- Open format?: No
- Website: www.radgametools.com/bnkmain.htm

Bink Video is a proprietary file format (extensions .bik and .bk2) for video developed by Epic Games Tools (formerly RAD Game Tools), a part of Epic Games.

== Overview ==
The format includes its own proprietary video and audio compression algorithms (video and audio codecs) supporting resolutions from 320×240 up to high definition video.

It is bundled as part of the Epic Video Tools along with RAD Game Tools' previous video codec, Smacker video. It is a hybrid block-transform and wavelet codec using 16 different encoding techniques. The codec places emphasis on lower decoding requirements over other video codecs with specific optimizations for the different computer game consoles it supports.

It has been primarily used for full-motion video sequences in video games, and has been used in games for Windows, Mac OS, as well as all major sixth-generation (Dreamcast, GameCube, PlayStation 2 and Xbox) and seventh-generation (Nintendo DS, PlayStation 3, PlayStation Portable, Wii and Xbox 360) game consoles.

The original format was reverse-engineered by the FFmpeg project and Bink decoding is supported by the open-source libavcodec library. The bk2 format is not supported yet.

== History ==
Bink was inducted into the Front Line Awards Hall of Fame by the Game Developer magazine in 2009. The winners for the award were published in the January 2010 issue of the magazine.

Bink 2, a new version of the format, was released in 2013. This new format is available for Windows (standard, Microsoft Store and Windows 8 Phone), Mac OS, Linux, major touchscreen smartphone platforms (Android and iOS), all three major seventh-generation consoles (PlayStation 3, Wii, Xbox 360), all major eighth-generation platforms except the Nintendo 3DS (Nintendo Switch, PlayStation 4, PlayStation Vita, Wii U and Xbox One) and the ninth-generation PlayStation 5 and Xbox Series X/S. Bink 2 is faster than Bink 1, while also supporting higher resolutions as well.

Epic Games acquired the technology and business of RAD Game Tools including Bink on January 7, 2021, renaming it to Epic Games Tools. It was announced they planned to integrate RAD's technology directly into Unreal Engine and that licenses will continue to be available to those who do not use the Unreal Engine in their work.

== Technical ==
Bink uses a wavelet-based compression algorithm optimized for game video sequences. It supports resolutions up to 4K and can encode at bitrates from 500 kbit/s to 200 Mbit/s. The codec is designed for efficient decompression, leveraging multithreading and SIMD instructions on modern CPUs. Bink also offers optional alpha channel support for composing video with 3D graphics.

== See also ==
- Miles Sound System
