= Multimedia framework =

Software framework for multimedia processing

A multimedia framework is a software framework that handles media on a computer and through a network. A good multimedia framework offers an intuitive API and a modular architecture to easily add support for new audio, video and container formats and transmission protocols. It is meant to be used by applications such as media players and audio or video editors, but can also be used to build videoconferencing applications, media converters and other multimedia tools. Data is processed among modules automatically, it is unnecessary for app to pass buffers between connected modules one by one.

In contrast to function libraries, a multimedia framework provides a run time environment for the media processing. Ideally such an environment provides execution contexts for the media processing blocks separated from the application using the framework. The separation supports the independent processing of multimedia data in a timely manner. These separate contexts can be implemented as threads.

== Overview ==
Multimedia frameworks act as an abstraction layer, simplifying the complexity of handling multimedia data formats, decoding and encoding streams, synchronizing audio and video playback, and managing multimedia resources. They provide a consistent interface for developers to access various multimedia components and services offered by the underlying operating system or hardware.

== Functionality ==
Modern multimedia frameworks typically offer a wide range of functionality, including but not limited to:

1. Codec Support: Multimedia frameworks often incorporate codecs for various audio and video formats, allowing developers to easily encode, decode, and manipulate multimedia data.
2. Synchronization: These frameworks provide mechanisms to synchronize audio and video streams, maintaining proper lip-sync and smooth playback.
3. Playback Control: Multimedia frameworks offer playback control features, such as play, pause, stop, seek, and volume adjustment, allowing developers to create interactive multimedia applications.
4. Streaming: Many frameworks support the streaming of multimedia content over networks, enabling real-time delivery and playback.
5. Capturing and Recording: Multimedia frameworks often include APIs for capturing audio and video from devices like cameras and microphones, as well as recording multimedia streams.

== Popular Multimedia Frameworks ==
Several prominent multimedia frameworks have gained widespread adoption, and they vary depending on the programming language and platform:

- GStreamer: Developed in C but with bindings available for various languages, GStreamer is a powerful, open-source multimedia framework widely used in Linux-based systems.
- DirectShow: Introduced by Microsoft, DirectShow is a multimedia framework for Windows-based systems, offering extensive support for audio and video playback, capture, and streaming.
  - Windows Media: An older multimedia framework used from Windows 98 SE to Windows XP.
  - Media Foundation: A multimedia framework used since Windows Vista.
- FFmpeg: Known for its extensive codec support, FFmpeg is a popular open-source multimedia framework used in a variety of platforms, including Windows, Linux, and macOS.
- AVFoundation: Exclusive to Apple's platforms (macOS, iOS, tvOS), AVFoundation provides a comprehensive set of multimedia APIs for creating, editing, and playing audiovisual content.
- GPAC Project on Advanced Content is an open-source multimedia framework focused on modularity and standards compliance.

== See also ==
- AVFoundation, Apple QuickTime multimedia framework replacement
- DirectShow, a multimedia framework and API produced by Microsoft for software developers to perform various operations with media files or streams.
- FFmpeg, a cross-platform multimedia framework to decode, encode, transcode, mux, demux, stream, filter and play media.
- GStreamer, a cross-platform pipeline-based multimedia framework
- Media Foundation, a COM-based multimedia framework pipeline and infrastructure platform provided by Microsoft for digital media in Windows Vista & Windows 7.
- Media Lovin' Toolkit, an open-source multimedia framework for television editing.
- Phonon, a cross-platform multimedia framework from the Qt toolkit
- QuickTime, a multimedia framework provided by Apple for Mac OS and Windows
- VLC Media Player, a media player and a multimedia framework by the VideoLAN project.
