= List of Microsoft Windows application programming interfaces and frameworks =

The following is a list of Microsoft APIs and frameworks.

== APIs ==
=== Current ===
- Component Model
  - Component Object Model (COM)
  - Distributed Component Object Model (DCOM)
  - COM+
  - Microsoft Data Access Components (MDAC), including: OLE DB
  - Cryptographic API (CAPICOM)
  - ActiveX Data Objects (ADO)
  - Collaboration Data Objects (CDO);
  - Windows Runtime (WinRT)
    - Universal Windows Platform (UWP)
- DirectShow
- DirectX
  - Direct2D
  - Direct3D
  - DirectDraw
  - DirectInput
  - DirectMusic
  - DirectPlay
  - DirectSetup
  - DirectSound
  - DirectWrite
  - XACT (Cross-platform Audio Creation Tool)
  - XAudio 2
- Media Foundation (Windows Vista / Windows 7)
- Interface
  - Graphics Device Interface (GDI) and GDI+
  - Application Programming Interface (API)
    - Messaging Application Programming Interface (MAPI)
    - Remote Application Programming Interface (RAPI)
    - Speech Application Programming Interface (SAPI)
    - Telephony Application Programming Interface (TAPI)
- Extensible Storage Engine (Jet Blue)
- Object linking and embedding (OLE)
  - OLE Automation
- Uniscribe (see Template:Microsoft APIs section: Software Factories)
- Windows Image Acquisition (WIA)
- Windows Management Instrumentation (WMI)
- Winsock
- Win32 console
- Windows API (current versions: Win32; Win64)

=== Deprecated ===
- Active Scripting
- ActiveX
- Collaboration Data Objects for Windows NT Server
- Dynamic Data Exchange
- Older data access technologies
  - Jet Database Engine
  - Data object
    - Jet Data Access Objects
    - Remote Data Objects (RDO)
  - Remote Data Services (RDS)
- Setup API
- Windows API (old versions: Win16; Win32s)
- XNA libraries for cross-platform Xbox 360/Windows development

== Frameworks ==
- .NET Framework
  - Remoting, Assemblies, Metadata
  - Common Language Runtime, Common Type System, Global Assembly Cache, Microsoft Intermediate Language, Windows Forms
  - ADO.NET, ASP.NET
  - Windows Communication Foundation (WCF)
  - Windows Presentation Foundation (WPF)
  - Windows Workflow Foundation (WF)
  - Windows CardSpace (WCS)
  - Universal Windows Platform (UWP)
  - Windows PowerShell
- Microsoft Management Console (MMC)
- Text Services Framework
- Windows Driver Model
- Windows Driver Foundation

== Libraries ==
- Microsoft Foundation Class Library (MFC)
- Active Template Library (ATL)
- Framework Class Library (FCL)
- Object Windows Library (OWL)
- Standard Template Library (STL)
- Visual Component Library (VCL)
- Windows Template Library (WTL)
- Windows UI Library (WinUI)
- Text Object Model (TOM)

== See also ==
- List of Microsoft topics
