= GSIF =

GSIF is a proprietary protocol and API between the TASCAM GigaStudio software (a virtual audio sampling device) and the soundcard connected to the computer. It is not known exactly what the initials stand for; it most likely means GigaSampler InterFace. GigaStudio having an important user base, it is supported by many soundcards manufacturer, although it is hardly as popular as the de facto standard, Steinberg's ASIO. It is recommended to install GSIF drivers only if the computer software actually requires GSIF software.

The focus in GSIF is to lower the latency in audio transactions whereas GSIF2 additionally provides audio routing capabilities between software and soundcard.

Since GigaStudio is (currently) a Windows-only software, GSIF is a Windows-only protocol.

== See also ==
- Microsoft's WDM kernel streaming
