= DirectX Diagnostic Tool =

Computer diagnostics tool

- DxDiag from DirectX 12 running on Windows 10
- Developer(s): Microsoft
- Operating system: Microsoft Windows
- Platform: 32-bit, 64-bit
- Predecessor: DXInfo
- License: Proprietary commercial software

DirectX Diagnostic Tool (DxDiag) is a diagnostics tool used to test DirectX functionality and troubleshoot video- or sound-related hardware problems. DirectX Diagnostic can save text files with the scan results. These files are often posted in tech forums or attached to support emails in order to give support personnel a better idea of the PC the requester is using in case the error is due to a hardware failure or incompatibility. It has been bundled with Windows since Windows 98 Second Edition (DirectX 6).

DirectX Diagnostic Tool is located in %SystemRoot%\System32. Starting from Windows Vista, DirectX Diagnostic Tool only shows information; it is no longer possible to test the hardware and the various DirectX components.

== Functions ==
The System tab displays the current DirectX version, the computer's hostname, the operating system's version, information on the system BIOS, and other data. The DirectX Files tab displays information about the versions of specific DirectX system files, which are portable executables or dynamic-link libraries (DLLs).

DirectX Diagnostic Tool displays information about the current display settings and the video hardware on the Display tab. If the computer has more than one monitor, then DirectX Diagnostic Tool will display a separate tab for each monitor. This tab can disable DirectDraw, Direct3D, and/or AGP Texture Acceleration for troubleshooting purposes. If the installed display driver has passed Windows Hardware Quality Labs testing, DirectX Diagnostic Tool will display this result on the right side of the window.

The Music tab displays information about the computer's MIDI settings, and lists different music-related software and hardware on your computer. The Input tab, displays information about input devices installed in the computer such as keyboards and mice. It will also attempt to detect problems with these devices. DirectX Diagnostic Tool also displays information about the installed DirectPlay Service Provider.

In Windows XP Professional x64 Edition, Windows Vista x64 edition, Windows 7 x64 edition, Windows 8 x64 edition and Windows 10 x64 edition, two versions of DirectX Diagnostic Tool are included, a native 64-bit version and a 32-bit version. In Windows XP Professional x64 Edition, Windows Vista x64 edition and Windows 7 x64 edition, the 32-bit version of DirectX Diagnostic Tool is run by default.
