= D3DX =

High level API library

In computing, D3DX (Direct3D Extension) is a high level API library which is written to supplement Microsoft's Direct3D graphics API. The D3DX library was introduced in Direct3D 7, and subsequently was improved in Direct3D 9. It provides classes for common calculations on vectors, matrices and colors, calculating look-at and projection matrices, spline interpolations, and several more complicated tasks, such as compiling or assembling shaders used for 3D graphic programming, compressed skeletal animation storage and matrix stacks. There are several functions that provide complex operations over 3D meshes like tangent-space computation, mesh simplification, precomputed radiance transfer, optimizing for vertex cache friendliness and strip reordering, and generators for 3D text meshes. 2D features include classes for drawing screen-space lines, text and sprite based particle systems. Spatial functions include various intersection routines, conversion from/to barycentric coordinates and bounding box and sphere generators.

The D3DX library contains pre-written routines for doing things common to most 2D/3D applications, such as games. Since the Direct3D API is relatively low-level, using the D3DX library is usually much simpler.

In 2012, Microsoft announced that D3DX 9, D3DX 10, and D3DX 11 would be deprecated in the Windows 8 SDK, along with other development frameworks such as XNA. Shader effects, texture management, geometry optimizations and mesh models are available as separate sources published through GitHub. The mathematical constructs of D3DX, like vectors and matrices, would be consolidated with XNAMath into a DirectXMath and spherical harmonics math is provided as separate source.

== Interfaces ==
The D3DX library follows the COM object-oriented programming model. Functionality is accessed using C++-like interfaces.

=== ID3DXEffect ===
The ID3DXEffect interface is used for compiling and binding FX shaders (.fx). It supports automatic mapping of named shader parameters to hardware constant registers, parameter pools, mapping textures to available samplers, specifying 'techniques' and modifying render states. FX effect files were text descriptions of Direct3D state that bundled rendering state, texture state, shaders, and parameters into one or more techniques; each technique could contain one or more passes, allowing an application to choose the implementation best suited to the target hardware at run time.

=== ID3DXFont ===
The ID3DXFont interface can be used to draw 2D text. See also D3DXCreateText that creates 3D meshes of text.

=== ID3DXLine ===
The ID3DXLine interface can be used for drawing anti-aliased screen-space lines with pattern.

=== ID3DXMesh ===
The ID3DXMesh interface is used for storage of meshes and mesh optimization for vertex cache friendliness and strip reordering. Some functions in D3DX operate on this interface. An example is D3DXComputeTangentFrame for creating a tangent-space frame for effects like normal and parallax mapping. A descendant of this class is ID3DXPMesh that can do geometry simplification.

=== ID3DXPRTEngine ===
It is used for Precomputed Radiance Transfer - a technique similar to spherical harmonics lighting that is used for precomputed global illumination and soft ambient lighting. Its methods were typically used offline to precompute per-vertex or per-texel transfer vectors, and Microsoft later noted that the PRT simulator remained available only in legacy D3DX9.

=== ID3DXSprite ===
The ID3DXSprite interface is a C++ class used for drawing a 2D image to the screen known as a sprite in computer graphics. In DirectX 7 this was typically done using the DirectDraw API, which is deprecated.

The programmer typically needs only to call the ID3DXSprite object's Begin() method to set up the render state and world transform for 2D drawing, call the Draw() method to add textures to the list to be drawn and finally call the End() method to draw the images to the screen and restore the original graphics state.

A common criticism of the D3DXSprite was that it was slow but this issue has been addressed as of Direct3D 9.

== Functions ==
=== D3DXComputeTangentFrame ===
It computes the tangent-space frame of a mesh that is used for effects like normal/bump mapping, parallax mapping and anisotropic lighting models. It handles vertices at tangent-space discontinuities by making duplicates, thus solving the hairy ball problem. It doesn't handle reversed UV winding of faces so models with mirrored texture mapping may run into lighting troubles because of this.

== Direct3D10 ==
The D3DX10 utility library for Direct3D 10 was similar to the D3DX for Direct3D 9 in functionality, and included the same D3DXMath library and Block Compression (BC1-BC5) software codecs. The key differences were that Effects for Direct3D 10 was made an OS component, the HLSL compiler was moved to a distinct D3DCompile DLL, and the texture image load & save code utilized the Windows Imaging Component. As a consequence of the shift to using WIC, D3DX10 did not support Truevision TGA, RGBE image format, or Portable PixMap file formats which were supported by D3DX. D3DX10 also did not include the UVAtlas isochart texture atlasing or Precomputed Radiance Transfer APIs.

All versions of D3DX10 are deprecated per Microsoft Docs.

== Direct3D11 ==
The D3DX11 utility library for Direct3D 11 was a trimmed down version of D3DX10. It included texture image load & save code using WIC, and the Block Compression (BC1-BC7) software codecs, but little else.

All versions of D3DX11 are deprecated per Microsoft Docs.

Most functionality from D3DX9, D3DX10, and D3DX11 has been moved to open source projects for Direct3D 11 or later: DirectXMath, DirectX Tool Kit, DirectXTex, DirectXMesh, and UVAtlas. There are also open source versions of DXUT and the Effects (FX11) runtime available. Unlike Effects 10, FX11 was distributed as source rather than in a DLL, and Microsoft described it as a porting aid for older FX9/FX10 code.

== Direct3D12 ==
There is no DLL-based D3DX12 utility library. There is, however, a D3DX12 utility header (all inline C++ code) for some basic helpers for Direct3D 12 documented on Microsoft Docs and is published on GitHub. It does not include functionality such as math, sprites, font rendering, 3D shapes, meshes, or texture loading. There is a DirectX Tool Kit for Direct3D 12 which provides the missing functionality.
