= Windows 2000 =

1999 Microsoft operating system version

- Version of the Windows NT operating system

- Screenshot of Windows 2000, showing the desktop and taskbar
- Developer: Microsoft
- Working state: No longer supported
- Source model: Closed-source; Source-available (through Shared Source Initiative)
- Released to manufacturing: December 15, 1999; 26 years ago
- General availability: February 17, 2000; 26 years ago
- Final release: Service Pack 4 with Update Rollup 1 (5.0.2195.7045) / September 13, 2005; 21 years ago
- Marketing target: Business and Server
- Update method: Windows Update; Windows Server Update Services (WSUS); System Center Configuration Manager (SCCM)
- Supported platforms: IA-32 (Alpha in alpha, beta, and release candidate versions (Note: DEC Alpha is supported in Windows 2000 in 32-bit versions only, using a 32-bit application binary interface on an otherwise native 64-bit platform. No versions of Windows NT for the 64-bit Alpha (AXP64) platform were available to the public; they were only developed internally by Microsoft and mainly served as testing grounds for the 64-bit Itanium (IA-64) platform when no other Itanium hardware was available and was still in development.))
- Kernel type: Hybrid (Windows NT)
- Userland: Windows API, NTVDM, OS/2 1.x, SFU
- Default user interface: Windows shell (Graphical)
- License: Proprietary commercial software
- Preceded by: Windows NT 4.0 (1996)
- Succeeded by: Windows XP Professional (client); Windows Server 2003 (servers)
- Official website: Windows 2000 (archived at Wayback Machine)

Support status
- Mainstream support ended on June 30, 2005. Extended support ended on July 13, 2010.

Windows 2000 is a major release of the Windows NT operating system developed by Microsoft, targeting the server and business markets. It is the direct successor to Windows NT 4.0, and was released to manufacturing on December 15, 1999, and then to retail on February 17, 2000, with Windows 2000 Datacenter Server being released on September 26, 2000.

Windows 2000 introduces NTFS 3.0, Encrypting File System, and basic and dynamic disk storage. Support for people with disabilities is improved over Windows NT 4.0 with a number of new assistive technologies, and Microsoft increased support for different languages and locale information. The Windows 2000 Server family has additional features, most notably the introduction of Active Directory, which in the years following became a widely used directory service in business environments. Although not present in the final release, support for Alpha was present in its alpha, beta, and release candidate versions. Its successor, Windows XP, only supports x86, x86-64 and Itanium processors. Windows 2000 was also the first NT release to drop the "NT" name from its product line, however the "NT" moniker would be used for one final time in the "Built on NT Technology" tagline used on the product's packaging as well as a few other places in the operating system (such as the boot and logon screens).

Four editions of Windows 2000 have been released: Professional, Server, Advanced Server, and Datacenter Server; the latter of which was launched months after the other editions. While each edition of Windows 2000 is targeted at a different market, they share a core set of features, including many system utilities such as the Microsoft Management Console and standard system administration applications.

Microsoft marketed Windows 2000 as the most secure Windows version ever at the time; however, it became the target of a number of high-profile virus attacks such as Code Red and Nimda. Windows 2000 was succeeded by Windows XP in October 2001, while Windows 2000 Server was succeeded by Windows Server 2003 in April 2003. For ten years since its release, it continued to receive patches for security vulnerabilities nearly every month until reaching end of support on July 13, 2010.

Both the original Xbox and the Xbox 360 use a modified version of the Windows 2000 kernel as their system software; the former's source code (as well as the source code for Windows NT 3.5) was leaked in 2020.

== History ==
Windows 2000, originally named Windows NT 5.0, is a continuation of the Microsoft Windows NT family of operating systems, replacing Windows NT 4.0. Chairman and CEO Bill Gates was originally "pretty confident" Windows NT 5.0 would ship in the first half of 1998, revealing that the first set of beta builds had been shipped in early 1997; these builds were identical to Windows NT 4.0, including a very similarly themed logo. Certain features such as the Microsoft Management Console as well as two-tone gradients on the Windows Explorer title bars (inherited from Windows 98) were introduced during this period. Beta versions of Internet Explorer 4 were also featured in these early builds before it was replaced by Internet Explorer 5 in later builds.

The first official beta was released in September 1997, followed by Beta 2 in August 1998. Windows NT 5.0 Beta 2 introduced a new "mini" graphical boot screen (in place of a text mode only boot screen in Windows NT 4.0 and prior), and elements of the "dark space" theme were removed in favor of the "square box" theme used in the final product.

On October 27, 1998, Microsoft announced that the name of the final version of the operating system would be Windows 2000, a name which referred to its projected release date. Windows 2000 was initially planned to replace both Windows 98 and Windows NT 4.0. However, this would be changed later, as an updated version of Windows 98 called Windows 98 Second Edition was released in June 1999.

Builds of Windows 2000 Beta 3 then followed after Beta 2; the new login prompt from the final version made its first appearance in Beta 3 build 1946 (the first build of Beta 3), the new, updated icons (for My Computer, Recycle Bin etc.) first appeared in Beta 3 build 1964, and the Windows 2000 boot screen seen in the final version first appeared in Beta 3 build 1983.

The Windows NT 5.0 and early Windows 2000 betas had different startup and shutdown sounds (some of which reused the same sounds as Windows NT 4.0), but during the Beta 3 builds, new piano-made startup and shutdown sounds were made, composed by Steven Ray Allen. These were changed to their final compositions before Beta 3's release, which was featured in the final product as well as in Windows Me. The newly updated system sounds from Windows 98, composed by Bill Wolford, were also carried out in later beta builds. Windows 2000 Beta 3 was released in May 1999.

Windows 2000 did not have an actual codename because, according to Dave Thompson of Windows NT team, "Jim Allchin didn't like codenames". Service Pack 1 for Windows 2000 was codenamed "Asteroid".

During development, builds for the Alpha architecture were compiled, but the project was abandoned in the final stages of development (between RC1 and RC2) after Compaq announced they had dropped support for Windows NT on Alpha. The Alpha 64-bit builds of Windows 2000 were also in development simultaneously with the 32-bit versions (all versions of Windows NT for Alpha were 32-bit only due to it using 32-bit application binary interfaces on an otherwise 64-bit processor) until it too was discontinued; development of Windows for Alpha 64-bit continued on for some time as a development platform for the 64-bit Intel Itanium platform when no other Itanium hardware was available at the time.

From here, Microsoft issued three release candidates between July and November 1999, and finally released the operating system to partners on December 12, 1999, followed by manufacturing three days later on December 15. The public could buy the full version of Windows 2000 on February 17, 2000.

About three days prior to release, which Microsoft advertised as "a standard in reliability," a leaked memo from Microsoft reported on by Mary Jo Foley revealed that Windows 2000 had "over 63,000 potential known defects." After Foley's article was published, she claimed that Microsoft blacklisted her for a considerable time. However, Abraham Silberschatz et al. claim in their computer science textbook that "Windows 2000 was the most reliable, stable operating system Microsoft had ever shipped to that point. Much of this reliability came from maturity in the source code, extensive stress testing of the system, and automatic detection of many serious errors in drivers." InformationWeek summarized the release "our tests show the successor to Windows NT 4.0 is everything we hoped it would be. Of course, it isn't perfect either." Wired News later described the results of the February launch as "lackluster." Novell criticized Microsoft's Active Directory, the new directory service architecture, as less scalable or reliable than its own Novell Directory Services (NDS) alternative.

Microsoft planned to release in 2000 a version of Windows 2000 which would run on 64-bit Intel Itanium microprocessors, specially codenamed "Janus". 64-bit builds of Windows 2000 were already in development for the Alpha 64-bit platform (which served as testing grounds for Itanium), however the first officially released 64-bit version of Windows was Windows XP 64-Bit Edition, released alongside the 32-bit editions of Windows XP on October 25, 2001, followed by the server versions Windows Datacenter Server Limited Edition and later Windows Advanced Server Limited Edition, which were based on the pre-release Windows Server 2003 (then known as Windows .NET Server) codebase. These editions were released in 2002, were shortly available through the OEM channel and then were superseded by the final versions of Server 2003 on April 24, 2003.

== New and updated features ==
Windows 2000 introduced many of the new features of Windows 98 and 98 SE into the NT line, such as the Windows Desktop Update, Internet Explorer 5 (Internet Explorer 6, which followed in 2001, is also available for Windows 2000), Outlook Express, NetMeeting, FAT32 support, 3DNow!, SSE and SSE2 support, Windows Driver Model, Internet Connection Sharing, Windows Media Player 6.4, WebDAV support etc. Certain new features are common across all editions of Windows 2000, among them NTFS 3.0, the Microsoft Management Console (MMC), UDF support, the Encrypting File System (EFS), Logical Disk Manager, Image Color Management 2.0, support for PostScript 3-based printers, OpenType (.OTF) and Type 1 PostScript (.PFB) font support (including a new font—Palatino Linotype—to showcase some OpenType features), the Data protection API (DPAPI), an LDAP/Active Directory-enabled Address Book, usability enhancements and multi-language and locale support. Windows 2000 also introduced USB device class drivers for USB printers, Mass storage class devices, and improved FireWire SBP-2 support for printers and scanners, along with a Safe removal applet for removable storage devices. Windows 2000 SP4 added native USB 2.0 support, Wireless Zero Configuration support and SSE3 support. Windows 2000 is also the first Windows version to support hibernation at the operating system level (OS-controlled ACPI S4 sleep state) unlike Windows 98 which required special drivers from the hardware manufacturer or driver developer.

A new capability designed to protect critical system files called Windows File Protection was introduced. This protects critical Windows system files by preventing programs other than Microsoft's operating system update mechanisms such as the Package Installer, Windows Installer and other update components from modifying them. The System File Checker utility provides users the ability to perform a manual scan of the integrity of all protected system files, and optionally repair them, either by restoring from a cache stored in a separate "DLLCACHE" directory, or from the original install media.

Microsoft recognized that a serious error (a Blue screen of death or stop error) could cause problems for servers that needed to be constantly running and so provided a system setting that would allow the server to automatically reboot when a stop error occurred. Also included is an option to dump any of the first 64 KB of memory to disk (the smallest amount of memory that is useful for debugging purposes, also known as a minidump), a dump of only the kernel's memory, or a dump of the entire contents of memory to disk, as well as write that this event happened to the Windows 2000 event log. In order to improve performance on servers running Windows 2000, Microsoft gave administrators the choice of optimizing the operating system's memory and processor usage patterns for background services or for applications. Windows 2000 also introduced core system administration and management features, such as the Windows Installer, Windows Management Instrumentation and Event Tracing for Windows (ETW) into the operating system.

=== Plug and Play and hardware support improvements ===
The most notable improvement from Windows NT 4.0 is the addition of Plug and Play with full ACPI and Windows Driver Model support. Similar to Windows 9x, Windows 2000 supports automatic recognition of installed hardware, hardware resource allocation, loading of appropriate drivers, PnP APIs and device notification events. The addition of the kernel PnP Manager along with the Power Manager are two significant subsystems added in Windows 2000.

Windows 2000 introduced version 3 print drivers (user mode printer drivers) based on Unidrv, which made it easier for printer manufacturers to write device drivers for printers. Generic support for 5-button mice is also included as standard and installing IntelliPoint allows reassigning the programmable buttons. Windows 98 lacked generic support. Driver Verifier was introduced to stress test and catch device driver bugs.

=== Shell ===
Windows 2000 introduces layered windows that allow for transparency, translucency and various transition effects like shadows, gradient fills and alpha-blended GUI elements to top-level windows. Menus support a new Fade transition effect.

Improvements in Windows Explorer: "Web-style" folders, media preview and customizable toolbars

The Start menu in Windows 2000 introduces personalized menus, expandable special folders and the ability to launch multiple programs without closing the menu by holding down the SHIFT key. A Re-sort button forces the entire Start Menu to be sorted by name. The Taskbar introduces support for balloon notifications which can also be used by application developers. Windows 2000 Explorer introduces customizable Windows Explorer toolbars, auto-complete in Windows Explorer address bar and Run box, advanced file type association features, displaying comments in shortcuts as tooltips, extensible columns in Details view (IColumnProvider interface), icon overlays, integrated search pane in Windows Explorer, sort by name function for menus, and Places bar in common dialogs for Open and Save.

Windows Explorer has been enhanced in several ways in Windows 2000. It is the first Windows NT release to include Active Desktop, first introduced as a part of Internet Explorer 4.0 (specifically Windows Desktop Update), and only pre-installed in Windows 98 by that time. It allowed users to customize the way folders look and behave by using HTML templates, having the file extension HTT. This feature was abused by computer viruses that employed malicious scripts, Java applets, or ActiveX controls in folder template files as their infection vector. Two such viruses are VBS/Roor-C and VBS.Redlof.a.

The "Web-style" folders view, with the left Explorer pane displaying details for the object currently selected, is turned on by default in Windows 2000. For certain file types, such as pictures and media files, the preview is also displayed in the left pane. Until the dedicated interactive preview pane appeared in Windows Vista, Windows 2000 had been the only Windows release to feature an interactive media player as the previewer for sound and video files, enabled by default. However, such a previewer can be enabled in previous versions of Windows with the Windows Desktop Update installed through the use of folder customization templates. The default file tooltip displays file title, author, subject and comments; this metadata may be read from a special NTFS stream, if the file is on an NTFS volume, or from an OLE structured storage stream, if the file is a structured storage document. All Microsoft Office documents since Office 4.0 make use of structured storage, so their metadata is displayable in the Windows 2000 Explorer default tooltip. File shortcuts can also store comments which are displayed as a tooltip when the mouse hovers over the shortcut. The shell introduces extensibility support through metadata handlers, icon overlay handlers and column handlers in Explorer Details view.

The right pane of Windows 2000 Explorer, which usually just lists files and folders, can also be customized. For example, the contents of the system folders aren't displayed by default, instead showing in the right pane a warning to the user that modifying the contents of the system folders could harm their computer. It's possible to define additional Explorer panes by using DIV elements in folder template files. This degree of customizability is new to Windows 2000; neither Windows 98 nor the Desktop Update could provide it. The new DHTML-based search pane is integrated into Windows 2000 Explorer, unlike the separate search dialog found in all previous Explorer versions. The Indexing Service has also been integrated into the operating system and the search pane built into Explorer allows searching files indexed by its database.

=== NTFS 3.0 ===
Microsoft released the version 3.0 of NTFS (sometimes incorrectly called "NTFS 5" in relation to the kernel version number) as part of Windows 2000; this introduced disk quotas (provided by QuotaAdvisor), file-system-level encryption, sparse files and reparse points. Sparse files allow for the efficient storage of data sets that are very large yet contain many areas that only have zeros. Reparse points allow the object manager to reset a file namespace lookup and let file system drivers implement changed functionality in a transparent manner. Reparse points are used to implement volume mount points, junctions, Hierarchical Storage Management, Native Structured Storage and Single Instance Storage. Volume mount points and directory junctions allow for a file to be transparently referred from one file or directory location to another.

Windows 2000 also introduces a Distributed Link Tracking service to ensure file shortcuts remain working even if the target is moved or renamed. The target object's unique identifier is stored in the shortcut file on NTFS 3.0 and Windows can use the Distributed Link Tracking service for tracking the targets of shortcuts, so that the shortcut file may be silently updated if the target moves, even to another hard drive.

=== Encrypting File System ===
The Encrypting File System (EFS) introduced strong file system-level encryption to Windows. It allows any folder or drive on an NTFS volume to be encrypted transparently by the user. EFS works together with the EFS service, Microsoft's CryptoAPI and the EFS File System Runtime Library (FSRTL).

EFS works by encrypting a file with a bulk symmetric key (also known as the File Encryption Key, or FEK), which is used because it takes less time to encrypt and decrypt large amounts of data than if an asymmetric key cipher were used. The symmetric key used to encrypt the file is then encrypted with a public key associated with the user who encrypted the file, and this encrypted data is stored in the header of the encrypted file. To decrypt the file, the file system uses the private key of the user to decrypt the symmetric key stored in the file header. It then uses the symmetric key to decrypt the file. Because this is done at the file system level, it is transparent to the user.

For a user losing access to their key, support for recovery agents that can decrypt files is built into EFS. A Recovery Agent is a user who is authorized by a public key recovery certificate to decrypt files belonging to other users using a special private key. By default, local administrators are recovery agents however they can be customized using Group Policy.

=== Basic and dynamic disk storage ===
Windows 2000 introduced the Logical Disk Manager and the diskpart command line tool for dynamic storage. All versions of Windows 2000 support three types of dynamic disk volumes (along with basic disks): simple volumes, spanned volumes and striped volumes:

- Simple volume, a volume with disk space from one disk.
- Spanned volumes, where up to 32 disks show up as one, increasing it in size but not enhancing performance. When one disk fails, the array is destroyed. Some data may be recoverable. This corresponds to SPAN and not to RAID-1.
- Striped volumes, also known as RAID-0, store all their data across several disks in stripes. This allows better performance because disk reads and writes are balanced across multiple disks. Like spanned volumes, when one disk in the array fails, the entire array is destroyed (some data may be recoverable).

In addition to these disk volumes, Windows 2000 Server, Windows 2000 Advanced Server, and Windows 2000 Datacenter Server support mirrored volumes and striped volumes with parity:

- Mirrored volumes, also known as RAID-1, store identical copies of their data on 2 or more identical disks (mirrored). This allows for fault tolerance; in the event one disk fails, the other disk(s) can keep the server operational until the server can be shut down for replacement of the failed disk.
- Striped volumes with parity, also known as RAID-5, functions similar to striped volumes/RAID-0, except "parity data" is written out across each of the disks in addition to the data. This allows the data to be "rebuilt" in the event a disk in the array needs replacement.

=== Accessibility ===
With Windows 2000, Microsoft introduced the Windows 9x accessibility features for people with visual and auditory impairments and other disabilities into the NT-line of operating systems. These included:

- StickyKeys: makes modifier keys (ALT, CTRL and SHIFT) become "sticky": a user can press the modifier key, and then release it before pressing the combination key. (Activated by pressing Shift five times quickly.)
- FilterKeys: a group of keyboard-related features for people with typing issues, including:
  - Slow Keys: Ignore any keystroke not held down for a certain period.
  - Bounce Keys: Ignore repeated keystrokes pressed in quick succession.
  - Repeat Keys: lets users slow down the rate at which keys are repeated via the keyboard's key-repeat feature.
- Toggle Keys: when turned on, Windows will play a sound when the CAPS LOCK, NUM LOCK or SCROLL LOCK key is pressed.
- SoundSentry: designed to help users with auditory impairments, Windows 2000 shows a visual effect when a sound is played through the sound system.
- MouseKeys: lets users move the cursor around the screen via the numeric keypad.
- SerialKeys: lets Windows 2000 support speech augmentation devices.
- High contrast theme: to assist users with visual impairments.
- Microsoft Magnifier: a screen magnifier that enlarges a part of the screen the cursor is over.

Additionally, Windows 2000 introduced the following new accessibility features:

- On-screen keyboard: displays a virtual keyboard on the screen and allows users to press its keys using a mouse or a joystick.
- Microsoft Narrator: introduced in Windows 2000, this is a screen reader that utilizes the Speech API 4, which would later be updated to Speech API 5 in Windows XP
- Utility Manager: an application designed to start, stop, and manage when accessibility features start. This was eventually replaced by the Ease of Access Center in Windows Vista.
- Accessibility Wizard: a control panel applet that helps users set up their computer for people with disabilities.

=== Languages and locales ===
Windows 2000 introduced the Multilingual User Interface (MUI). Besides English, Windows 2000 incorporates support for Arabic, Armenian, Baltic, Central European, Cyrillic, Georgian, Greek, Hebrew, Indic, Japanese, Korean, simplified Chinese, Thai, traditional Chinese, Turkic, Vietnamese and Western European languages. It also has support for many different locales.

Since Windows 2000, English versions of Windows (NT) can support display and input right-to-left languages (such as Arabic) and CJKV languages, but related files needed to be installed in Control Panel.

=== Games ===
Windows 2000 includes DirectX 7.0, commonly used by game developers on Windows 98. The last version of DirectX that was released for Windows 2000 was DirectX 9.0c (Shader Model 3.0). Microsoft published quarterly updates to DirectX 9.0c through the February 2010 release after which support was dropped in the June 2010 SDK. These updates contain bug fixes to the core runtime and some additional libraries such as D3DX, XAudio 2, XInput and Managed DirectX components. The majority of games written for versions of DirectX 9.0c (up to the February 2010 release) therefore run on Windows 2000.

Windows 2000 included the same games as Windows NT 4.0 did: FreeCell, Minesweeper, Pinball, and Solitaire.

=== System utilities ===
Windows 2000's Computer Management console can perform many system tasks. This image shows a disk defragmentation in progress.

Windows 2000 introduced the Microsoft Management Console (MMC), which is used to create, save, and open administrative tools. Each of these is called a console, and most allow an administrator to administer other Windows 2000 computers from one centralised computer. Each console can contain one or many specific administrative tools, called snap-ins. These can be either standalone (with one function), or an extension (adding functions to an existing snap-in). In order to provide the ability to control what snap-ins can be seen in a console, the MMC allows consoles to be created in author mode or user mode. Author mode allows snap-ins to be added, new windows to be created, all portions of the console tree to be displayed and consoles to be saved. User mode allows consoles to be distributed with restrictions applied. User mode consoles can grant full access to the user for any change, or they can grant limited access, preventing users from adding snapins to the console though they can view multiple windows in a console. Alternatively users can be granted limited access, preventing them from adding to the console and stopping them from viewing multiple windows in a single console.

The main tools that come with Windows 2000 can be found in the Computer Management console (in Administrative Tools in the Control Panel). This contains the Event Viewer—a means of viewing system or application-related events and the Windows equivalent of a log file, a system information utility, a backup utility, Task Scheduler and management consoles to view open shared folders and shared folder sessions, configure and manage COM+ applications, configure Group Policy, manage all the local users and user groups, and a device manager. It contains Disk Management and Removable Storage snap-ins, a disk defragmenter as well as a performance diagnostic console, which displays graphs of system performance and configures data logs and alerts. It also contains a service configuration console, which allows users to view all installed services and to stop and start them, as well as configure what those services should do when the computer starts. CHKDSK has significant performance improvements.

Windows 2000 comes with two utilities to edit the Windows registry, REGEDIT.EXE and REGEDT32.EXE. REGEDIT has been directly ported from Windows 98, and therefore does not support editing registry permissions. REGEDT32 has the older multiple document interface (MDI) and can edit registry permissions in the same manner that Windows NT's REGEDT32 program could. REGEDIT has a left-side tree view of the Windows registry, lists all loaded hives and represents the three components of a value (its name, type, and data) as separate columns of a table. REGEDT32 has a left-side tree view, but each hive has its own window, so the tree displays only keys and it represents values as a list of strings. REGEDIT supports right-clicking of entries in a tree view to adjust properties and other settings. REGEDT32 requires all actions to be performed from the top menu bar. Windows XP is the first system to integrate these two programs into a single utility, adopting the REGEDIT behavior with the additional NT features.

The System File Checker (SFC) also comes with Windows 2000. It is a command line utility that scans system files and verifies whether they were signed by Microsoft and works in conjunction with the Windows File Protection mechanism. It can also repopulate and repair all the files in the Dllcache folder.

=== Recovery Console ===
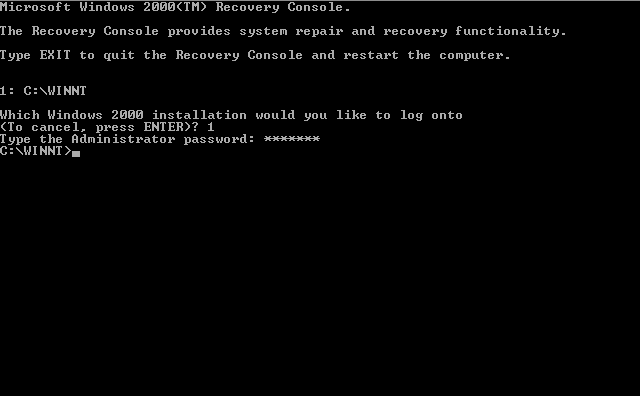
The Recovery Console is usually used to recover unbootable systems.

The Recovery Console is run from outside the installed copy of Windows to perform maintenance tasks that can neither be run from within it nor feasibly be run from another computer or copy of Windows 2000. It is usually used to recover the system from problems that cause booting to fail, which would render other tools useless, like Safe Mode or Last Known Good Configuration, or chkdsk. It includes commands like fixmbr, which are not present in MS-DOS.

It has a simple command-line interface, used to check and repair the hard drive(s), repair boot information (including NTLDR), replace corrupted system files with fresh copies from the CD, or enable/disable services and drivers for the next boot.

The console can be accessed in either of the two ways:

1. Booting from the Windows 2000 CD, and choosing to start the Recovery Console from the CD itself instead of continuing with setup. The Recovery Console is accessible as long as the installation CD is available.
2. Preinstalling the Recovery Console on the hard disk as a startup option in Boot.ini, via WinNT32.exe, with the /cmdcons switch. In this case, it can only be started as long as NTLDR can boot from the system partition.

=== Windows Scripting Host 2.0 ===
Windows 2000 introduced Windows Script Host 2.0 which included an expanded object model and support for logon and logoff scripts.

=== Networking ===
- Starting with Windows 2000, the Server Message Block (SMB) protocol directly interfaces with TCP/IP. In Windows NT 4.0, SMB requires the NetBIOS over TCP/IP (NBT) protocol to work on a TCP/IP network.
- Windows 2000 introduces a client-side DNS caching service. When the Windows DNS resolver receives a query response, the DNS resource record is added to a cache. When it queries the same resource record name again and it is found in the cache, then the resolver does not query the DNS server. This speeds up DNS query time and reduces network traffic.

=== Server family features ===
The Windows 2000 Server family consists of Windows 2000 Server, Windows 2000 Advanced Server, Windows 2000 Small Business Server, and Windows 2000 Datacenter Server.

All editions of Windows 2000 Server have the following services and features built in:

- Routing and Remote Access Service (RRAS) support, facilitating dial-up and VPN connections using IPsec, L2TP or L2TP/IPsec, support for RADIUS authentication in Internet Authentication Service, network connection sharing, Network Address Translation, unicast and multicast routing schemes.
- Remote access security features: Remote Access Policies for setup, verify Caller ID (IP address for VPNs), callback and Remote access account lockout
- Autodial by location feature using the Remote Access Auto Connection Manager service
- Extensible Authentication Protocol support in IAS (EAP-MD5 and EAP-TLS) later upgraded to PEAPv0/EAP-MSCHAPv2 and PEAP-EAP-TLS in Windows 2000 SP4
- DNS server, including support for Dynamic DNS. Active Directory relies heavily on DNS.
- IPsec support and TCP/IP filtering
- Smart card support
- Microsoft Connection Manager Administration Kit (CMAK) and Connection Point Services
- Support for distributed file systems (DFS)
- Hierarchical Storage Management support including remote storage, a service that runs with NTFS and automatically transfers files that are not used for some time to less expensive storage media
- Fault tolerant volumes, namely Mirrored and RAID-5
- Group Policy (part of Active Directory)
- IntelliMirror, a collection of technologies for fine-grained management of Windows 2000 Professional clients that duplicates users' data, applications, files, and settings in a centralized location on the network. IntelliMirror employs technologies such as Group Policy, Windows Installer, Roaming profiles, Folder Redirection, Offline Files (also known as Client Side Caching or CSC), File Replication Service (FRS), Remote Installation Services (RIS) to address desktop management scenarios such as user data management, user settings management, software installation and maintenance.
- COM+, Microsoft Transaction Server and Distributed Transaction Coordinator
- MSMQ 2.0
- TAPI 3.0
- Integrated Windows Authentication (including Kerberos, Secure channel and SPNEGO (Negotiate) SSP packages for Security Support Provider Interface (SSPI)).
- MS-CHAP v2 protocol
- Public Key Infrastructure (PKI) and Enterprise Certificate Authority support
- Terminal Services and support for the Remote Desktop Protocol (RDP)
- Internet Information Services (IIS) 5.0 and Windows Media Services 4.1
- Network quality of service features
- A new Windows Time service which is an implementation of Simple Network Time Protocol (SNTP) as detailed in IETF RFC 1769. The Windows Time service synchronizes the date and time of computers in a domain running on Windows 2000 Server or later. Windows 2000 Professional includes an SNTP client.

The Server editions include more features and components, including the Microsoft Distributed File System (DFS), Active Directory support and fault-tolerant storage.

==== Distributed File System ====
The Distributed File System (DFS) allows shares in multiple different locations to be logically grouped under one folder, or DFS root. When users try to access a network share off the DFS root, the user is really looking at a DFS link and the DFS server transparently redirects them to the correct file server and share. A DFS root can only exist on a Windows 2000 version that is part of the server family, and only one DFS root can exist on that server.

There can be two ways of implementing a DFS namespace on Windows 2000: either through a standalone DFS root or a domain-based DFS root. Standalone DFS allows for only DFS roots on the local computer, and thus does not use Active Directory. Domain-based DFS roots exist within Active Directory and can have their information distributed to other domain controllers within the domain – this provides fault tolerance to DFS. DFS roots that exist on a domain must be hosted on a domain controller or on a domain member server. The file and root information is replicated via the Microsoft File Replication Service (FRS).

==== Active Directory ====
A new way of organizing Windows network domains, or groups of resources, called Active Directory, is introduced with Windows 2000 to replace Windows NT's earlier domain model. Active Directory's hierarchical nature allowed administrators a built-in way to manage user and computer policies and user accounts, and to automatically deploy programs and updates with a greater degree of scalability and centralization than provided in previous Windows versions. User information stored in Active Directory also provided a convenient phone book-like function to end users. Active Directory domains can vary from small installations with a few hundred objects, to large installations with millions. Active Directory can organise and link groups of domains into a contiguous domain name space to form trees. Groups of trees outside of the same namespace can be linked together to form forests.

Active Directory services could always be installed on a Windows 2000 Server Standard, Advanced, or Datacenter computer, and cannot be installed on a Windows 2000 Professional computer. However, Windows 2000 Professional is the first client operating system able to exploit Active Directory's new features. As part of an organization's migration, Windows NT clients continued to function until all clients were upgraded to Windows 2000 Professional, at which point the Active Directory domain could be switched to native mode and maximum functionality achieved.

Active Directory requires a DNS server that supports SRV resource records, or that an organization's existing DNS infrastructure be upgraded to support this. There should be one or more domain controllers to hold the Active Directory database and provide Active Directory directory services.

==== Volume fault tolerance ====
Along with support for simple, spanned and striped volumes, the Windows 2000 Server family also supports fault-tolerant volume types. The types supported are mirrored volumes and RAID-5 volumes:

- Mirrored volumes: the volume contains several disks, and when data is written to one it is also written to the other disks. This means that if one disk fails, the data can be totally recovered from the other disk. Mirrored volumes are also known as RAID-1.
- RAID-5 volumes: a RAID-5 volume consists of multiple disks, and it uses block-level striping with parity data distributed across all member disks. Should a disk fail in the array, the parity blocks from the surviving disks are combined mathematically with the data blocks from the surviving disks to reconstruct the data on the failed drive "on-the-fly."

== Deployment ==
Windows 2000 can be deployed to a site via various methods. It can be installed onto servers via traditional media (such as CD) or via distribution folders that reside on a shared folder. Installations can be attended or unattended. During a manual installation, the administrator must specify configuration options. Unattended installations are scripted via an answer file, or a predefined script in the form of an INI file that has all the options filled in. An answer file can be created manually or using the graphical Setup manager. The Winnt.exe or Winnt32.exe program then uses that answer file to automate the installation. Unattended installations can be performed via a bootable CD, using Microsoft Systems Management Server (SMS), via the System Preparation Tool (Sysprep), via the Winnt32.exe program using the /syspart switch or via Remote Installation Services (RIS). The ability to slipstream a service pack into the original operating system setup files is also introduced in Windows 2000.

The Sysprep method is started on a standardized reference computer – though the hardware need not be similar – and it copies the required installation files from the reference computer to the target computers. The hard drive does not need to be in the target computer and may be swapped out to it at any time, with the hardware configured later. The Winnt.exe program must also be passed a /unattend switch that points to a valid answer file and a /s file that points to one or more valid installation sources.

Sysprep allows the duplication of a disk image on an existing Windows 2000 Server installation to multiple servers. This means that all applications and system configuration settings will be copied across to the new installations, and thus, the reference and target computers must have the same HALs, ACPI support, and mass storage devices – though Windows 2000 automatically detects "plug and play" devices. The primary reason for using Sysprep is to quickly deploy Windows 2000 to a site that has multiple computers with standard hardware. (If a system had different HALs, mass storage devices or ACPI support, then multiple images would need to be maintained.)

Systems Management Server can be used to upgrade multiple computers to Windows 2000. These must be running Windows NT 3.51, Windows NT 4.0, Windows 98 or Windows 95 OSR2.x along with the SMS client agent that can receive software installation operations. Using SMS allows installations over a wide area and provides centralised control over upgrades to systems.

Remote Installation Services (RIS) are a means to automatically install Windows 2000 Professional (and not Windows 2000 Server) to a local computer over a network from a central server. Images do not have to support specific hardware configurations and the security settings can be configured after the computer reboots as the service generates a new unique security ID (SID) for the machine. This is required so that local accounts are given the right identifier and do not clash with other Windows 2000 Professional computers on a network. RIS requires that client computers are able to boot over the network via either a network interface card that has a Pre-Boot Execution Environment (PXE) boot ROM installed or that the client computer has a network card installed that is supported by the remote boot disk generator. The remote computer must also meet the Net PC specification. The server that RIS runs on must be Windows 2000 Server and it must be able to access a network DNS Service, a DHCP service and the Active Directory services.

== Editions ==
Windows 2000 system requirements
Requirement	Minimum	Recommended
IA-32 PCs
CPU	Pentium 133 MHz	Pentium II 300 MHz
Memory	32 MB (128 MB for Windows 2000 Server)	128 MB (256 MB for Windows 2000 Server)
Free space	1 GB (2 GB for Windows 2000 Server)	5 GB
Graphics hardware	800×600 VGA or better monitor	1024×768 VGA or better monitor
Input device(s)	Keyboard and/or mouse	

Microsoft released various editions of Windows 2000 for different markets and business needs: Professional, Server, Advanced Server and Datacenter Server. Each was packaged separately.

Windows 2000 Professional was designed as the desktop operating system for businesses and power users. It is the client version of Windows 2000. It offers greater security and stability than many of the previous Windows desktop operating systems. It supports up to two processors, and can address up to 4 GB of RAM. The system requirements are a Pentium processor (or equivalent) of 133 MHz or greater, at least 32 MB of RAM, 650 MB of hard drive space, and a CD-ROM drive (recommended: Pentium II, 128 MB of RAM, 2 GB of hard drive space, and CD-ROM drive). However, despite the official minimum processor requirements, it is still possible to install Windows 2000 on 4th-generation x86 CPUs such as the 80486.

Windows 2000 Embedded and Windows 2000 Professional Embedded/Windows 2000 Professional For Embedded Systems are versions of Windows 2000 Professional that were designed for embedded use, targeting ATMs, vending machines and other large embedded devices. Windows 2000 Embedded was cancelled during development in favor of Windows XP Embedded, however the binary identical FES versions were instead released in its place, which functions exactly the same as their retail counterparts, but licensed for embedded use.

Screenshot of Windows 2000 Server with Configure Your Server component

Windows 2000 Server shares the same user interface with Windows 2000 Professional, but contains additional components for the computer to perform server roles and run infrastructure and application software. A significant new component introduced in the server versions is Active Directory, which is an enterprise-wide directory service based on LDAP (Lightweight Directory Access Protocol). Additionally, Microsoft integrated Kerberos network authentication, replacing the often-criticised NTLM (NT LAN Manager) authentication system used in previous versions. This also provided a purely transitive-trust relationship between Windows 2000 Server domains in a forest (a collection of one or more Windows 2000 domains that share a common schema, configuration, and global catalog, being linked with two-way transitive trusts). Furthermore, Windows 2000 introduced a Domain Name Server which allows dynamic registration of IP addresses. Windows 2000 Server supports up to 4 processors and 4 GB of RAM, with a minimum requirement of 128 MB of RAM and 1 GB hard disk space, however requirements may be higher depending on installed components.

Windows 2000 Server Embedded and Windows 2000 Server For Embedded Systems are binary identical versions of Windows 2000 Server that were designed for embedded use. Both versions function exactly the same as their retail counterparts, but licensed for embedded use.

Windows 2000 Advanced Server is a variant of Windows 2000 Server operating system designed for medium-to-large businesses. It offers the ability to create clusters of servers, support for up to 8 CPUs, a main memory amount of up to 8 GB on Physical Address Extension (PAE) systems and the ability to do 8-way SMP. It supports TCP/IP load balancing and builds on Microsoft Cluster Server (MSCS) in Windows NT Enterprise Server 4.0, adding enhanced functionality for two-node clusters. System requirements are similar to those of Windows 2000 Server, however they may need to be higher to scale to larger infrastructure.

Screenshot of Windows 2000 Datacenter Server, asking the user to complete setup by configuring Cluster and Remote Installation service in the Configure Your Server component

Windows 2000 Datacenter Server is a variant of Windows 2000 Server designed for large businesses that move large quantities of confidential or sensitive data frequently via a central server. Like Advanced Server, it supports clustering, failover and load balancing. Its minimum system requirements are similar to those of Advanced Server, but it was designed to be capable of handing advanced, fault-tolerant and scalable hardware—for instance computers with up to 32 CPUs and 32 GBs RAM, with rigorous system testing and qualification, hardware partitioning, coordinated maintenance and change control. Windows 2000 Datacenter Server was released to manufacturing on August 11, 2000 and launched on September 26, 2000. This edition was based on Windows 2000 with Service Pack 1 and was not available at retail.

== Service packs ==
Service pack	Release date
Service Pack 1 (SP1)	August 15, 2000
Service Pack 2 (SP2)	May 16, 2001
Service Pack 3 (SP3)	August 29, 2002
Service Pack 4 (SP4)	June 26, 2003
SP4 Update Rollup	September 13, 2005

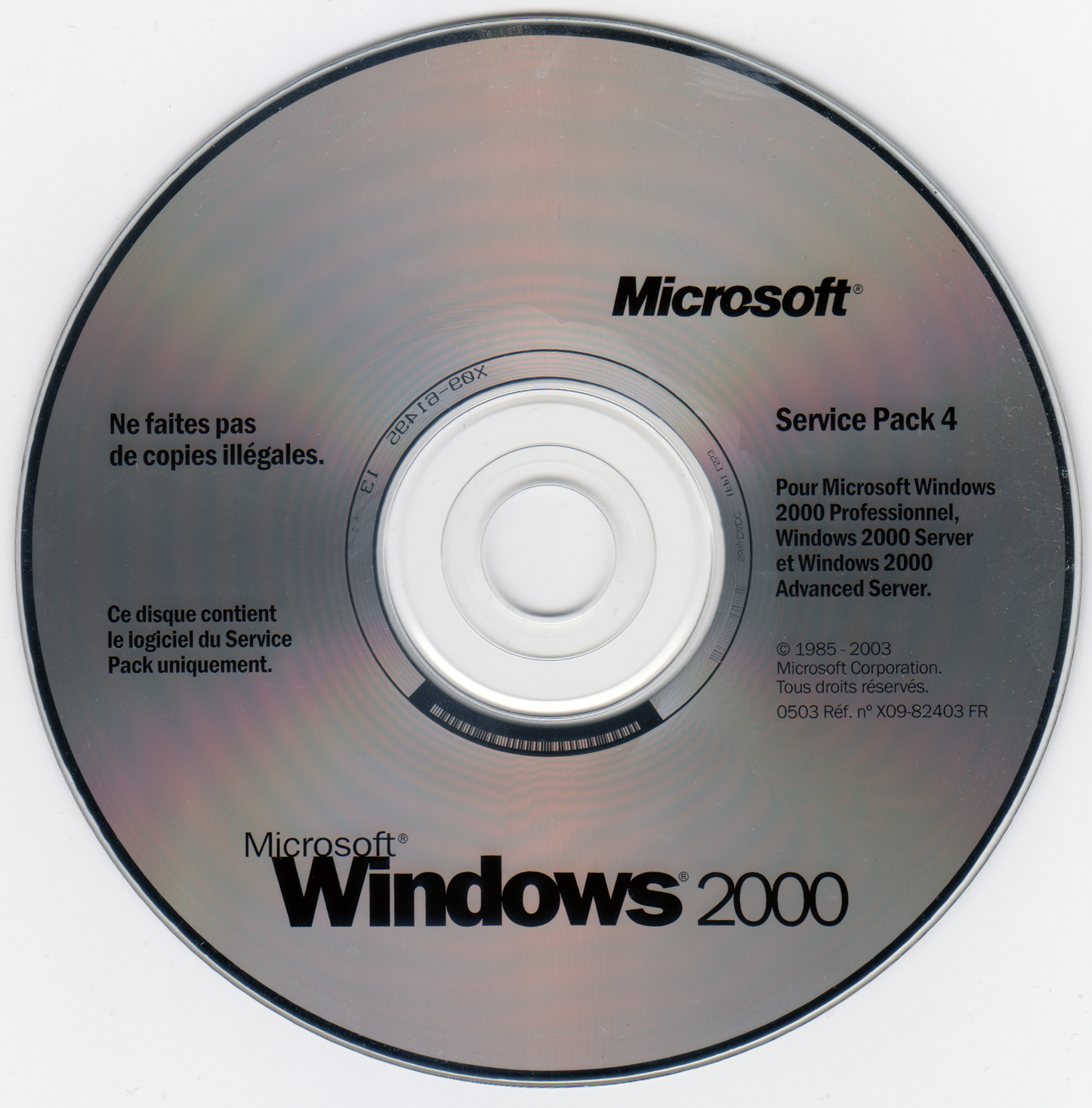
SP4 installation disc

Windows 2000 has received four full service packs and one rollup update package following SP4, which is the last service pack. Microsoft phased out all development of its Java Virtual Machine (JVM) from Windows 2000 in SP3. Internet Explorer 5.01 has also been upgraded to the corresponding service pack level.

Microsoft had originally intended to release a fifth service pack for Windows 2000, but cancelled this project early in its development, and instead released Update Rollup 1 for SP4 on September 13, 2005, which was a collection of all security-related hotfixes and some other significant issues. The Update Rollup does not include all non-security related hotfixes and is not subjected to the same extensive regression testing as a full service pack. Microsoft states that this update will meet customers' needs better than a whole new service pack, and will still help Windows 2000 customers secure their PCs, reduce support costs, and support existing computer hardware.

== Upgradeability ==
Several Windows 2000 components are upgradable to the latest versions, which include new versions introduced in later versions of Windows, and other major Microsoft applications are available. These latest versions for Windows 2000 include:

- ActiveSync 4.5
- DirectX 9.0c (February 5, 2010, Redistributable)
- Internet Explorer 6 SP1 and Outlook Express 6 SP1
- Microsoft Agent 2.0
- Microsoft Data Access Components 2.81
- Microsoft NetMeeting 3.01
- Microsoft Virtual PC 2004 SP1
- Office 2003 SP3
- MSN Messenger 7.0 (Windows Messenger)
- MSXML 6.0 SP2
- .NET Framework 2.0 SP2
- Tweak UI 1.33
- Visual C++ 2008
- Visual Studio 2005
- Windows Desktop Search 2.66
- Windows Script Host 5.7
- Windows Installer 3.1
- Windows Media Format Runtime and Windows Media Player 9 Series (including Windows Media Encoder 7.1 and the Windows Media 8 Encoding Utility)

== Security ==
During the Windows 2000 period, the nature of attacks on Windows servers changed: more attacks came from remote sources via the Internet. This has led to an overwhelming number of malicious programs exploiting the IIS services – specifically a notorious buffer overflow tendency. This tendency is not operating-system-version specific, but rather configuration-specific: it depends on the services that are enabled. Following this, a common complaint is that "by default, Windows 2000 installations contain numerous potential security problems. Many unneeded services are installed and enabled, and there is no active local security policy." In addition to insecure defaults, according to the SANS Institute, the most common flaws discovered are remotely exploitable buffer overflow vulnerabilities. Other criticized flaws include the use of vulnerable encryption techniques.

Code Red and Code Red II were famous (and much discussed) worms that exploited vulnerabilities of the Windows Indexing Service of Windows 2000's Internet Information Services (IIS). In August 2003, security researchers estimated that two major worms called Sobig and Blaster infected more than half a million Microsoft Windows computers. The 2005 Zotob worm was blamed for security compromises on Windows 2000 machines at ABC, CNN, the New York Times Company, and the United States Department of Homeland Security.

On September 8, 2009, Microsoft skipped patching two of the five security flaws that were addressed in the monthly security update, saying that patching one of the critical security flaws was "infeasible." According to Microsoft Security Bulletin MS09-048: "The architecture to properly support TCP/IP protection does not exist on Microsoft Windows 2000 systems, making it infeasible to build the fix for Microsoft Windows 2000 Service Pack 4 to eliminate the vulnerability. To do so would require re-architecting a very significant amount of the Microsoft Windows 2000 Service Pack 4 operating system, there would be no assurance that applications designed to run on Microsoft Windows 2000 Service Pack 4 would continue to operate on the updated system." No patches for this flaw were released for the newer Windows XP (32-bit) and Windows XP Professional x64 Edition either, despite both also being affected; Microsoft suggested turning on Windows Firewall in those versions.

== Support lifecycle ==
Windows 2000 Professional and Windows 2000 Server were superseded by newer Microsoft operating systems: Windows XP Professional and Windows Server 2003 respectively.

While users of Windows 2000 Professional and Server were eligible to purchase the upgrade license for Windows Vista Business or Windows Server 2008, neither of these operating systems can directly perform an upgrade installation from Windows 2000; a clean installation must be performed instead or a two-step upgrade through XP/2003. Microsoft has dropped the upgrade path from Windows 2000 (and earlier) to Windows 7. Users of Windows 2000 must buy a full Windows 7 license.

The Windows 2000 family of operating systems moved from mainstream support to the extended support phase on June 30, 2005. Microsoft says that this marks the progression of Windows 2000 through the Windows lifecycle policy. Under mainstream support, Microsoft freely provides design changes if any, service packs and non-security related updates in addition to security updates, whereas in extended support, service packs are not provided and non-security updates require contacting the support personnel by e-mail or phone. Under the extended support phase, Microsoft continued to provide critical security updates every month for all components of Windows 2000 (including Internet Explorer 5.0 SP4) and paid per-incident support for technical issues.

Windows 2000 reached the end of its lifecycle (EoL) on July 13, 2010 (alongside Service Pack 2 of Windows XP). It will not receive new security updates and new security-related hotfixes after this date. In Japan, over 130,000 servers and 500,000 PCs in local governments were affected; many local governments said that they will not update as they do not have funds to cover a replacement.

As of 2011, Windows Update still supports the Windows 2000 updates available on Patch Tuesday in July 2010, e.g., if older optional Windows 2000 features are enabled later. The Windows Malicious Software Removal Tool installed monthly by Windows Update for XP and later versions can be still downloaded manually for Windows 2000.

Microsoft Office products under Windows 2000 have their own product lifecycles. While Internet Explorer 6 for Windows XP did receive security patches up until it lost support, this is not the case for IE6 under Windows 2000. Because of Windows 2000's age, updated versions of components such as Windows Media Player 11 and Internet Explorer 7 have not been released for it. In the case of Internet Explorer, Microsoft said that "some of the security work in IE 7 relies on operating system functionality in XP SP2 that is non-trivial to port back to Windows 2000."

Although Windows 2000 is the last NT-based version of Microsoft Windows which does not include product activation, Microsoft has introduced Windows Genuine Advantage for certain downloads and non-critical updates from the Download Center for Windows 2000.

In 2020, Microsoft announced that it would disable the Windows Update service for SHA-1 endpoints for older Windows versions. Since Windows 2000 did not get an update for SHA-2, Windows Update Services are no longer available on the OS as of late July 2020. As of March 2024, many of the old updates for Windows 2000 are still available on the Microsoft Update Catalog. A third-party tool named Legacy Update allows previously released updates for Windows 2000 to be installed from the Update Catalog. An independent project named Windows Update Restored is also available since 2022 and aims to restore the Windows Update websites for older versions of Windows, including Windows 2000.

== Total cost of ownership ==
In October 2002, Microsoft commissioned IDC to determine the total cost of ownership (TCO) for enterprise applications on Windows 2000 versus the TCO of the same applications on Linux. IDC's report is based on telephone interviews of IT executives and managers of 104 North American companies in which they determined what they were using for a specific workload for file, print, security and networking services. IDC determined that the four areas where Windows 2000 had a better TCO than Linux – over a period of five years for an average organization of 100 employees – were file, print, network infrastructure and security infrastructure. They determined, however, that Linux had a better TCO than Windows 2000 for web serving. The report also found that the greatest cost was not in the procurement of software and hardware, but in staffing costs and downtime. While the report applied a 40% productivity factor during IT infrastructure downtime, recognizing that employees are not entirely unproductive, it did not consider the impact of downtime on the profitability of the business. The report stated that Linux servers had less unplanned downtime than Windows 2000 servers. It found that most Linux servers ran less workload per server than Windows 2000 servers and also that none of the businesses interviewed used 4-way SMP Linux computers. The report also did not take into account specific application servers – servers that need low maintenance and are provided by a specific vendor. The report did emphasize that TCO was only one factor in considering whether to use a particular IT platform, and also noted that as management and server software improved and became better packaged the overall picture shown could change.

== Source code leak ==
On or shortly before February 12, 2004, "portions of the Microsoft Windows 2000 and Windows NT 4.0 source code were illegally made available on the Internet." The source of the leak was later traced to Mainsoft, a Windows Interface Source Environment partner. Microsoft issued the following statement:

"Microsoft source code is both copyrighted and protected as a trade secret. As such, it is illegal to post it, make it available to others, download it or use it."

Despite the warnings, the archive containing the leaked code spread widely on the file-sharing networks. On February 16, 2004, an exploit "allegedly discovered by an individual studying the leaked source code" for certain versions of Microsoft Internet Explorer was reported. On April 15, 2015, GitHub took down a repository containing a copy of the Windows NT 4.0 source code that originated from the leak.

== See also ==
- Architecture of Windows NT
- BlueKeep (security vulnerability)
- Comparison of operating systems
- DEC Multia, one of the DEC Alpha computers capable of running Windows 2000 beta
- Microsoft Servers, Microsoft's network server software brand
- Windows Neptune, a cancelled consumer edition based on Windows 2000
