= Windows legacy audio components =

Obsolete Microsoft Windows audio APIs

This article describes audio APIs and components in Microsoft Windows which are now obsolete or deprecated.

== Multimedia Extensions (MME) ==
The MME API or the Windows Multimedia API (also known as WinMM) was the first universal and standardized Windows audio API. Wave sound events played in Windows (up to Windows XP) and MIDI I/O use MME. The devices listed in the Multimedia/Sounds and Audio control panel applet represent the MME API of the sound card driver.

The Multimedia Extensions (WaveIn/WaveOut interfaces) were released in autumn 1991 to support sound cards, as well as CD-ROM drives, which were then becoming increasingly available. The Multimedia Extensions were released to Original Equipment Manufacturers (OEMs), mainly CD-ROM drive and sound card manufacturers, and added basic multimedia support for audio input and output and a CD audio player application to Windows 3.0. The Multimedia Extensions' new features were not available in Windows 3.0 real mode, only in standard and 386 enhanced mode. Windows 3.1x would later incorporate many of its features. Microsoft developed the Windows Sound System sound card specification to complement these extensions.

In Windows 9x with VxD audio is used, MME lacks mixing multiple audio streams during playback and device sharing, so only one audio stream can be rendered at a time. But some sound card drivers (such as Sound Blaster Live!) can emulate more than one MME device (or support more than a single streaming client) so it could work with MME too. Starting from Windows 2000 with WDM audio, MME supports playback device sharing (multi-client access) and can mix playback streams together. Starting from Windows XP, MME started to support recording device sharing.

In earlier Windows versions, MME supported up to two channels of recording, 16-bit audio bit depth and sampling rates of up to 44100 samples per second with all the audio being mixed and sampled to 44100 samples per second. Starting from Windows 2000, MME supports up to 384000 samples per second, up to 8 channels, and up to 32 bits per sample.

Prior to Windows XP, the number of MME/WinMM device interfaces (waveIn, waveOut, midiIn, midiOut, mixer, and aux) is restricted to 10. This limit is raised from 10 to 32 in Windows XP.

Device name length in MME is restricted to 31 characters so long device names may appear only partially.

=== Issues ===
A fault in the MME WaveIn/WaveOut emulation was introduced in Windows Vista: if sample rate conversion is needed, audible noise is sometimes introduced, such as when playing audio in a web browser that uses these APIs. This is because the internal resampler, which is no longer configurable, defaults to a fast integer-based linear interpolation, which was the lowest-quality conversion mode that could be set in previous versions of Windows. The resampler can be set to a high-quality mode via a hotfix for Windows 7 and Windows Server 2008 only.

== Audio Compression Manager ==
Audio Compression Manager (ACM) is a Windows multimedia framework that manages audio codecs (compressor/decompressors). ACM can also be considered an API specification. A codec must conform to the implicit ACM specification to work with Windows Multimedia. ACM files can be recognized by their filename extension .acm. ACM files also use RIFF-compatible filetypes such as WAV or AVI as a "wrapper" to store audio data encoded by any audio codec supported by ACM.

ACM is considered an outdated framework/API and Microsoft now encourages the use of at least DirectShow. However, unlike ACM and the related Video Compression Manager (VCM), DirectShow provides no means to encode files for end-users but requires developers to build end-to-end graphs for encoding content. ACM also does not support VBR audio streams; therefore newer codecs like MPEG-4 AAC, Ogg Vorbis, FLAC etc. cannot be supported through ACM if using variable bitrates. Though many sources state the contrary, Ogg Vorbis does work well with the ACM, e.g. when embedded in a RIFF-compatible file (such as a WAV or AVI file as mentioned earlier), provided the Ogg Vorbis stream is encoded at a constant bitrate.

Windows comes with a number of ACM codecs pre-installed. For a list of these codecs, consult WAV file § Comparison of coding schemes.

ACM codecs are identified by a two-byte code (TwoCC) allocated by Microsoft.

== DirectX Audio Libraries ==
- DirectSound
- DirectMusic

== KMixer ==
KMixer (kmixer.sys) is the Kernel Audio Mixer driver, a part of WDM Audio in Windows 98 to Windows XP which handles the mixing of multiple sound buffers into an output.

The tasks performed by KMixer.sys:

- Mixing multiple PCM audio streams
- Sample-rate conversion
- Speaker configuration
- Audio bit depth and audio channel conversion
- Audio volume control

In Windows 98, Windows 2000 and Windows Me, the KMixer maximum sample rate is 96 kHz. In Windows XP SP1 and later, KMixer audio sampling rate supports a maximum of 192 kHz. The actual resampling rate of KMixer is highly decided by audio drivers and audio devices; later the WASAPI introduced changeable resampling rate.

In Windows 98 to Windows XP, the vendor-offered GFX filter can be included in audio drivers, and it can be used for audio enhancement features. Later the GFX filter was replaced by APO in Windows Vista.

=== Issues ===
The KMixer was designed to aid the applications by relieving them from the need to perform the mixing of audio streams, especially on low-end sound cards that didn't support multiple sound streams. However, it introduced some significant problems.

First, the latency of KMixer is around 30 ms and it cannot be reduced, because this component sits just right above the port class audio driver, so every audio stream, including those issued by DirectSound (except in cases of hardware mixing) and WinMM, come through the kernel mixer. If the audio hardware supports hardware mixing (also known as hardware buffering or DirectSound hardware acceleration), DirectSound buffers directly to the rendering device. Thus, if DirectSound streams use hardware mixing, KMixer is bypassed.

In earlier releases like the original release of Windows 98, KMixer tried to mix every data format that passed through it, even those it did not support. It caused various problems with media players that tried to pass AC3-encoded surround sound streams through S/PDIF output of the sound card to an external home cinema receiver. This was corrected with Windows Me and provided as a hotfix for Windows 98 Second Edition and Windows 2000 SP2. Starting with Windows Me, the waveOut, DirectSound, and DirectShow APIs support non-PCM formats such as AC-3 or WMA over S/PDIF and non-PCM data goes directly to the class driver instead of going through KMixer.

A new kernel-mode API, Direct Kernel Streaming, was also introduced in Windows 98 in order to bypass the KMixer and avoid problems associated with it.

KMixer does not alter the sound in the majority of cases. Also, there are many ways to bypass KMixer without the need of an extra plugin to access DirectSound, ASIO, Direct Kernel Streaming or WASAPI. In Windows XP, for example, the usage of DirectSound (which Winamp uses by default) with a hardware mixer is a way to bypass KMixer; software such as full screen games may also use this way to bypass KMixer.

KMixer was removed in Windows Vista. It is replaced by the user-mode WASAPI (Windows Audio Session API) Audio Engine which is part of the revamped audio architecture. The Audio engine can operate in Shared mode or Exclusive mode. In shared mode, mixing still takes place. Pre-mixed PCM audio is sent to the driver in a single format (in terms of sample rate, bit depth and channel count) that is configurable from the Sounds control panel. WASAPI Exclusive mode bypasses the mixer, as does using third-party audio APIs like OpenAL or ASIO, which still have direct access to the hardware.

== Kernel Streaming ==
Kernel Streaming or Direct Kernel streaming (Direct KS) is a technique that supports kernel-mode processing of streamed data. It enables efficient real-time streaming for multimedia devices such as sound cards and TV tuner cards. Kernel streaming allows a device driver to create DirectShow-like filters and pins in kernel mode, providing access to hardware, lower latency communication and still be used within a DirectShow filter graph.

Kernel streaming was introduced in Windows 98. When the sound card uses a custom driver for use with the system supplied port class driver PortCls.sys or implements a mini-driver for use with the streaming class driver, applications can bypass the KMixer completely and use the kernel streaming interfaces instead to directly interact with audio driver and reduce latency. Windows 98 includes the first kernel streaming driver, Stream.sys. In Windows XP, Microsoft introduced another improved kernel streaming class driver, AVStream.

Music players such as JRiver Media Center, JPLAY, foobar2000, Audirvana Studio and Winamp support kernel streaming. Some full-screen games are also use kernel streaming to bypass KMixer. Compared to the regular "WaveOut method" in Microsoft Windows, kernel streaming requires less CPU time. This comes at the expense of bypassing the KMixer and Windows volume control. Kernel streaming also does not allow device sharing unless kernel-mode audio driver supports multiple clients.

Prior to Windows Vista, Kernel Streaming offered only a single client-to-driver communication protocol with buffer chain, as used in MME. Starting from Vista, new Real-Time Audio (RT Audio, not to be confused with the RTAudio codec) protocol is introduced, based on a single circular buffer. RT Audio protocol is implemented by WaveRT port driver in portcls.sys. In Vista and later versions, Audio Subsystem supports both protocols so it can interact with both legacy and new audio drivers. But most audio applications that use KS support only a single protocol (legacy in most cases) so they can communicate only with a single type of audio drivers.

== See also ==
- WDM audio in Windows 98
- Windows Vista audio architecture
- DirectX
- Universal Audio Architecture (UAA)

== Broken links ==
- Kernel Streaming components
- MME API (WinMM)
- Kernel Streaming components (documented for re-implementation in ReactOS)
