= Managed DirectX =

API used with Microsoft's .NET platform

- Developer: Microsoft
- Initial release: 2002; 23 years ago
- Stable release: MDX 1.1
- Preview release: MDX 2.0 beta
- Operating system: Microsoft Windows
- Platform: .NET Framework
- Successor: Microsoft XNA
- License: Freeware
- Website: msdn.microsoft.com/directx/

Managed DirectX (MDX) is Microsoft's deprecated API for DirectX programming on .NET Framework. MDX can be used from any language on .NET Framework (via the Common Language Runtime). MDX can be used to develop multimedia and interactive applications (e.g. games, compiled only to x86), enabling high performance graphical representation and enabling the programmer to make use of modern graphical hardware while working inside the .NET Framework.

== Overview ==
Managed DirectX was first released in 2002 to allow less complicated access to the DirectX API through the .NET framework. The Managed DirectX SDK allows developers access to numerous classes which allow the rendering of 3D graphics (Direct3D) and the other DirectX API's in a much easier, object-oriented manner. MDX, however, does not support the newer APIs such as Direct3D 10, XInput, and XAudio 2.

MDX is deprecated in favor of XNA Game Studio Express. It is, however, possible to use some other, more direct APIs to the DirectX framework such as the open-source SlimDX and SharpDX project.

== Versions ==
=== MDX 1.1 ===
- This was the first version available and still is the current stable version.
- Can be used under .NET Framework versions 1.1 and 2.0.
- Provides an object-oriented API that implements functionality very similar to DirectX 9.

=== MDX 2.0 beta ===
- Was canceled while still in beta. Is no longer available.
- MDX 2.0 was replaced by Microsoft XNA (DirectX New Architecture).
- The API differed from MDX 1.1 in a number of places.
