= Collaboration Data Objects =

Application programming interface

Collaboration Data Objects (CDO), previously known as OLE Messaging or Active Messaging, is an application programming interface (API) included with Microsoft Windows and Microsoft Exchange Server products. The library allows developers to access the Global Address List and other server objects, in addition to the contents of mailboxes and public folders.

== Overview ==
CDO is a technology for building messaging or collaboration applications. CDO can be used separately or in connection with Outlook Object Model to gain more access over Outlook. CDO is not a part of Outlook Object Model and it doesn't provide any event-based functionality, nor can Outlook objects be manipulated using CDO.

Starting with Exchange 2007, neither the Messaging API (MAPI) client libraries nor CDO 1.2.1 are provided as a part of the base product installation. They are available as downloads.

== Versions ==
- CDONTS: available on Windows NT 4.0 by installing the Option Pack, or Exchange Server.
- CDOSYS: available on Windows 2000 and onwards by installing the SMTP service in Internet Information Server (IIS).

== See also ==
- Collaboration Data Objects for Windows NT Server
- MAPI
- ActiveX
