= Collaboration Data Objects for Windows NT Server =

Collaboration Data Objects for Windows NT Server (CDONTS) is a component included with Microsoft's Windows NT and Windows 2000 server products. It facilitates creating and sending e-mail messages from within web application scripts, typically ASP pages. It is implemented as a COM component, and requires a locally installed SMTP server to handle mail delivery.

CDONTS was deprecated in Windows 2000, and removed completely in Windows Server 2003 in favour of a significantly improved interface, Collaboration Data Objects (CDOSYS).
