= Universal Audio Architecture =

Universal Audio Architecture logo

Universal Audio Architecture (UAA) is an initiative unveiled in 2002 by Microsoft to standardize the hardware and class driver architecture for audio devices in modern Microsoft Windows operating systems. Three classes of audio devices are supported by default: USB audio class, IEEE 1394 (FireWire), and Intel High Definition Audio which supports PCI and PCI Express.

Starting with Windows Vista, Microsoft requires all computer and audio device manufacturers to support Universal Audio Architecture in order to pass Windows Logo certification.

== Overview ==
The goal of the Universal Audio Architecture is to solve a very common problem in older Microsoft Windows products, that of inconsistent support for audio. Due to the lack of a common system by which audio devices could describe their capabilities to the operating system, not to mention a lack of ability to control those capabilities, audio device manufacturers (such as Creative Labs, Realtek, Turtle Beach and others) have had to provide a series of control panels and custom interfaces to let a user control the device. This, in turn, requires kernel-mode drivers so that the user's actions can be communicated to the hardware itself. Poorly written audio drivers have been a common source of system instability in Windows, especially with games that make use of extended audio card capabilities. These concerns prompted Microsoft to disable the audio stack entirely by default in Windows Server 2003.

UAA seeks to resolve problems by putting forth a standardized interface which audio devices can follow, ensuring that the device's capabilities will be recognized and used effectively by Windows, without the need for additional drivers or custom control panels. It also provides a reasonable assurance that an audio device will still be able to work many years down the road, without requiring vendor-supplied drivers for a newer version of Windows.

Another goal of UAA is to provide better support for multi-channel audio in Windows so that, for example, multi-channel WMA Pro audio streams can be played without special driver support.

UAA is intended to be a complete replacement for developing WDM Audio Drivers; however, in some cases it may be necessary for an otherwise UAA-compliant audio device to expose capabilities that cannot be done through UAA. Windows will continue to fully support audio drivers that use the PortCls and AVStream drivers.

== History ==
In 2004, Microsoft provided the first version of UAA as an update to Windows 2000 Service Pack 4, Windows XP Service Pack 1 and Windows Server 2003, but is only available by contacting Microsoft support directly. However, almost all manufacturer supplied drivers contain the UAA class driver. Windows XP Service Pack 3 also includes the updated driver, as well as Windows XP Professional x64 Edition with Service Pack 1 and 2.

In Windows Vista, the Windows Logo program requirements state that any machine shipped with Vista must include a UAA-compliant audio device that works without additional drivers.

In Windows 11, SoundWire is supported by UAA.

== See also ==
- Windows Vista audio architecture
- Windows legacy audio components
