= Audio Stream Input/Output =

Computer sound card driver protocol

ASIO
- Developer: Steinberg
- Stable release: 1.0.7 / March 18, 2024; 2 years ago
- Operating system: Windows 10, 11; Discontinued: Windows 7 (2024); Windows 8, 8.1 (2023); Windows XP, Vista (2019); Windows 98, Me (2006; Windows 95 (2001)
- Platform: x86-64, Arm64
- Type: API
- License: Proprietary, GPLv3
- Website: www.steinberg.net/developers

Audio Stream Input/Output (ASIO) is a computer audio interface driver protocol for digital audio specified by Steinberg, providing high data throughput, synchronization, and low latency between a software application and a computer's audio interface or sound card.

ASIO bypasses the normal audio path from a user application through layers of intermediary operating system software, such as KMixer, Direct KS or WASAPI, so that an application connects directly to the sound card hardware. Each layer that is bypassed means a reduction in latency (the delay between an application sending audio information and it being reproduced by the sound card, or input signals from the sound card being available to the application). In this way, ASIO offers a relatively simple way of accessing multiple audio inputs and outputs independently. For this reason, ASIO is sometimes used for Hi-Res Audio playback. Also, the ASIO capable sound cards are widely used for Digital Audio Workstation (DAW) software.

== History ==
ASIO was initially released in 1997 in order to enable streaming of one or more audio streams from an (multi-input/output) audio interface to a software and vice versa with minimal latency and sample accurate synchronization of the audio streams. It allows the audio streams to use any sample rate and supports bit resolutions of 16, 24, 32 bit integer and 32 or 64 bit floating point.

The release of ASIO 2.0 in 1999 brought further enhancements such as ASIO Direct Monitoring, where an audio signal is monitored directly from the audio interface with close to zero latency, and ASIO Positioning Protocol, used to sample accurately synchronize a computer to other digital machines such as ADAT recorder or also other computers.

ASIO 2.3 introduced monitoring for dropouts in the audio stream.

== Operating systems ==
Currently only Microsoft Windows is supported by the ASIO SDK, with support on Intel-based and ARM64 platforms. Hardware vendors need to supply a proprietary device driver to support ASIO; for example, multichannel USB Audio Class interface chips by XMOS use an ASIO-compatible audio driver developed by Thesycon.

As of 2026, Microsoft, Qualcomm, and Yamaha Corporation are developing an updated in-box Windows device driver for USB Audio Class compliant hardware which includes multi-client ASIO support, to be distributed through Windows Update for X86-64 and ARM64 versions of Windows 11.

While originally supporting MacOS, the introduction of Core Audio with macOS X made ASIO support for this OS unnecessary.

There is an experimental ASIO driver for Wine, WineASIO, for a Windows compatibility layer for Linux. WineASIO driver uses the JACK sound server as its audio back-end and allows many ASIO-aware applications to run with low latency under WINE.

== Licensing ==
The license to use the ASIO software development kit (SDK) and to distribute an ASIO driver is free of charge, however a proprietary SDK license agreement has to be signed.

In October 2025, Steinberg announced that ASIO will be available under a dual license, adding GPLv3 as an open-source license option.

== See also ==
- WASAPI, native audio API for Windows Vista and later
- JUCE, an open-source C++ toolkit that includes support for ASIO audio devices.
- JACK Audio Connection Kit, a similar system primarily for Linux.
