= DirectPlay =

Microsoft DirectX API component

DirectPlay is part of Microsoft's DirectX. It is a network communication library intended for computer game development, although it can be used for other purposes.

DirectPlay is a high-level software interface between applications and communication services that allows games to be connected over the Internet, a modem link, or a network. It features a set of tools that allow players to find game sessions and sites to manage the flow of information between hosts and players. It provides a way for applications to communicate with each other, regardless of the underlying online service or protocol. It also resolves many connectivity issues, such as Network Address Translation (NAT).

Like the rest of DirectX, DirectPlay runs in COM and is accessed through component object model (COM) interfaces. By default, DirectPlay uses multi-threaded programming techniques and requires careful thought to avoid the usual threading issues. Since DirectX 9, this issue can be alleviated at the expense of efficiency.

== Networking ==
DirectPlay is built on the User Datagram Protocol (UDP) to allow it speedy communication with other DirectPlay applications. It uses TCP and UDP ports 2300 to 2400 and 47624.

== Interfaces ==
- The primary interfaces (methods of access) for DirectPlay are:
  - IDirectPlay8Server, which allows access to server functionality
  - IDirectPlay8Client, which allows access to client functionality
  - IDirectPlay8Peer, which allows access to peer-to-peer functionality
- Secondary interfaces are:
  - Various lobby interfaces that allows players to find and prepare a game before it actually commences.
  - Thread management interfaces that allows the programmer to fine-tune resource usage. This also allows for a general disabling of worker threads so that tricky multi-threaded issues are avoided at the cost of decreased responsiveness.
  - Various network address translation (NAT) interfaces that make it easier for players behind routers to host games. Most players on broadband internet connections face this problem.
  - Various voice communication interfaces known as DirectPlay Voice that make it easier to support audio communication and voice input in games.
  - Various queue monitoring interfaces that allow the application to get feedback on how much data has been sent and received as requested. This allows an application to decrease/increase the amount of data sent in accordance with the capabilities of the receiver.

== DirectPlay Voice ==
DirectPlay Voice was introduced in Windows Me as part of DirectX 7.1 for multiplayer games. It is a voice communications, recording and playback API that allows gamers to use voice chat in games written to take advantage of the API, through a DirectPlay network transport session itself.

== Current status ==
DirectPlay was traditionally one of the components of DirectX that received less attention, but for DirectX 8 it received a major overhaul and became a relatively lightweight networking library. However, as part of Microsoft's unveiling of XNA in 2004, Microsoft announced that DirectPlay would be deprecated in favor of Games for Windows - Live technology already available on Xbox and being ported for use on Windows PCs. DirectPlay was supported in DirectX DLLs for the lifetime of Microsoft Windows XP. However, starting from the autumn of 2007, the headers and libraries — vital components if developers wanted to develop new programs utilizing the technology — were removed from the DirectX SDK.

In Windows Vista, DirectPlay has been deprecated and DirectPlay Voice and DirectPlay's NAT Helper have been removed. In Windows 10, DirectPlay is fully deprecated, and modern game development has transitioned to more current technologies like Xbox Live and other networking APIs.

Currently in 2026, it is still active and being used on Windows 11, however it is not as popular as it was a decade ago as it is not necessary for many newer games

== See also ==
- DirectX
