= USB video device class =

USB device class for webcams and other video input devices

The USB video device class (also USB video class or UVC) is a USB device class that describes devices capable of streaming video like webcams, digital camcorders, transcoders, analog video converters, capture cards, and still-image cameras.

The latest revision of the USB video class specification carries the version number 1.5 and was defined by the USB Implementers Forum in a set of documents describing both the basic protocol and the different payload formats.

== Devices ==
=== Webcams ===
Webcams were among the first devices to support the UVC standard and are currently the most popular UVC devices.

=== TV receivers and video recorders ===
UVC v1.5 supports transmission of compressed video streams, including MPEG-2 TS, H.264, MPEG-4 SL SMPTE VC1 and MJPEG.

== Formats ==
- Uncompressed YUV formats YUY2, NV12
- DV formats SD-DV, SDL-DV, and HD-DV (525-60, 625–50, 1125–60, 1250–50)
- Frame-based
- Video stream formats like MPEG-2 TS, H.264, MPEG-4 SL, SMPTE VC1, VP8 and MJPEG

== Revision history ==
For detailed history on releases, see the revision history section of the published USB UVC documents, available from the USB.org page.

Version	Date	Description
1.0	September 4, 2003	Initial release
1.0a	December 4, 2003	Add additional descriptor subtypes for "extension" types. FAQ: Added section 2.21 Interlaced video
1.0b	Unknown	Changes to FAQ only: Protocol STALL behavior, current and future payload header formats
1.0c	June 5, 2004	Changes to FAQ only: Added motion JPEG format
1.1	June 1, 2005	Major update including among other things: New documents specifying for stream and frame based payloads, latency optimizations for stream-based formats, specification of absolute and relative control relationship, asynchronous controls behavior, change naming from "VDC" to "UVC", obsolete old formats and add new ones, add a flag to distinguish between dynamic and fixed frame rate devices (RR0043).
1.5	June 6, 2012	Added H.264 and VP8 formats, and accompanying controls for video encoders. Included references to USB 3.0

== Operating system support ==
Android
As of the release of Android 10 (and still as of June 2020) Android does not support UVC (USB video devices). Earlier Android versions do support UVC. As of December 2023 Feature drop update to Android 14 UVC support returns to the system.
Linux
USB video class support for Linux is provided by the Linux UVC driver, although as of July 2017 support for still-image capture is not yet implemented. The UVC driver has been included in the Linux kernel source code since kernel version 2.6.26. Detection of UVC 1.5 devices was introduced in Linux kernel version 4.5, but support in the driver for UVC 1.5 specific features or specific UVC 1.5 devices was not added and MPEG-2 TS, H.264 and VP8 payloads are not supported yet. The result is that some UVC 1.5 devices that also support UVC 1.1 work correctly.
macOS
macOS ships with a UVC driver included since version 10.4.3, updated in 10.4.9 to work with iChat.
Windows
Windows XP has a class driver for USB video class 1.0 devices since Service Pack 2, as does Windows Vista and Windows CE 6.0. A post-service pack 2 update that adds more capabilities is also available. Windows 7 added UVC 1.1 support. Support for UVC 1.5 is currently only available in Windows 8, 10 and 11. Most device manufacturers do, however, provide their own drivers tailored to the capabilities of the product in question.: In Microsoft Windows, hardware acceleration support for UVC device required vendor drivers must be installed.

UVC Version	Windows XP/Vista	Windows 7	Windows 8/10/11
USB Video Class 1.0	Supported	Supported	Supported
USB Video Class 1.1	Not supported	Supported	Supported
USB Video Class 1.5 (H.264 video codec)	Not supported	Not supported	Supported

FreeBSD
FreeBSD added the uvc driver for UVC devices in Jan 18, 2011; added in the 9.0 release.
NetBSD
NetBSD added the uvideo driver for UVC devices in September 2008; added in the 5.0 release.
OpenBSD
OpenBSD added the uvideo driver for UVC devices in April 2008; it appears in the 4.4 release.
PlayStation 3
The PlayStation 3 added support for UVC compatible webcams in firmware version 1.54 (only works for video chat, not games.)
MenuetOS
MenuetOS added support for UVC compatible webcams in version 0.87
Nintendo Switch 2
The Nintendo Switch 2 has supported UVC compatible webcams since its release, being used for compatible games and system features such as GameChat. However, the Switch 2 appears to have some special requirements in order for webcams to work, with companies such as Elgato and UGREEN looking to release firmware updates for their webcams in order to meet them.
Solaris
Solaris includes support for UVC webcams in the form of the usbvc driver for OpenSolaris. The driver ships with Solaris Express build 56 and later.

== See also ==
- List of USB Device Classes
- Camera Serial Interface
