= TXF =

TXF may refer to:

- The X-Files, an American science fiction television series
- The X Factor, a television music talent show franchise
- Transactional NTFS, a component of Windows Vista and later operating systems
