= TDI =

TDI may refer to:

== Science and technology ==
- Tolerable daily intake, in toxicology
- Toluene diisocyanate, an organic chemical
- Time delay and integration, timing synchronization in an image sensor
- Tissue Doppler imaging, a medical ultrasound technology
- Tabbed document interface, a type of graphical user interface
- Total dual integrality, a property of matrices in mathematical optimization
- Transport Driver Interface, used by NT series Windows to abstract level 7 APIs into a common protocol for the Transport Protocol layer
- Trophic Diatom Index, water quality and ecological status; see Sattal
- TDI (engine) (turbocharged direct injection), a diesel engine design used in cars and light vans made by Volkswagen Group
- Thomson Digital Image (1984-1993), a french 3d software company, creators of TDI Explore 3d animation software

== Organizations ==
- Technical Diving International, a technical diving organization
- Telecommunications for the Deaf, Inc., a nonprofit organization promoting telecommunications devices for the deaf
- Texas Department of Insurance
- The Dartmouth Institute for Health Policy and Clinical Practice, a subsidiary of Dartmouth College
- Transportation Displays, Inc., a unit of Outfront Media
- Technical group of Independents (1999-2001)
- Technical group of Independents (1979-1984)

== Entertainment ==
- Total Drama Island, an animated reality series
  - Total Drama Island (2023), the 2023 reboot with the same name.
- Tangerine Dream Independent, the record label belonging to Edgar Froese
