= WDF =

WDF may refer to:

- Westdeutsches Fernsehen, now WDR Fernsehen, German regional TV
- Windows Driver Frameworks, Microsoft software tools
- World Darts Federation
- Wigner distribution function
- Western Desert Force
