= Class driver =

Type of hardware device driver

In computing, a class driver is a type of hardware device driver that can operate a large number of different devices of a broadly similar type. Class drivers are often used with USB based devices, which share the essential USB class protocol in common, and devices with similar functionality can easily adopt common protocols.

Instead of having a separate driver for every kind of CD-ROM device, a class driver can operate a wide variety of CD-ROMs from different manufacturers. To accomplish this the manufacturers make their products compatible with a standardized protocol.

In technical terms, a class driver is used as a base or ancestor class for specific drivers which need to have slightly different or extended functionality, but which can take advantage of the majority of the functionality provided by the class driver. This concept is a key aspect of object oriented programming, which when extended to drivers makes it much easier for hardware vendors to provide driver support for their products.

Some operating systems, such as Microsoft Windows, and Linux distributions in x86 platforms, have included a large number of class drivers.

== Examples ==
- USB mass storage device class
- NVM Express

== See also ==
- Windows Driver Model
- USB video device class
- USB device classes
