= Aggressive Link Power Management =

Aggressive Link Power Management (ALPM) is a power management protocol for Advanced Host Controller Interface-compliant (AHCI) Serial ATA (SATA) devices, such as hard disk drives and solid-state drives.

== Description ==
When enabled via the AHCI controller, this allows the SATA host bus adapter to enter a low-power state during periods of inactivity, thus saving energy. The drawback to this is increased periodic latency as the drive must be re-activated and brought back on-line before it can be used, and this will often appear as a delay to the end-user.

== States ==
There are three states:

- Active
- Low Power with two internal states Partial and Slumber. Partial has a maximum return latency of 10 microseconds while slumber has a maximum latency of 10 milliseconds. The states can be initiated by Host (HIPM), Device (DIPM) or both. If SATA hot swapping is enabled, this state is unavailable.
- Device Sleep with a maximum return latency of 20 milliseconds unless otherwise specified in Identify Data Log. If SATA hot swapping is enabled, this state is unavailable.

These can be selected by the SATA AHCI driver, usually via a configuration option, or by the OS Power Options.

With system inbox AHCI driver, Windows Vista and later utilise only HIPM by default; Windows Vista and later allows the tweaking of AHCI LPM modes through a registry hack.

== See also ==
- Energy Star
- Green computing
- Active State Power Management (ASPM)
- DevSlp
