= Microsoft Distributed Transaction Coordinator =

Component of Microsoft Windows

The Microsoft Distributed Transaction Coordinator (MSDTC) service is a component of Microsoft Windows that is responsible for coordinating transactions that span multiple resource managers, such as databases, message queues, and file systems. MSDTC is included in Windows 2000 and later operating systems, and is also available for Windows NT 4.0.

MSDTC performs the transaction coordination role for components, usually with COM and .NET architectures. In MSDTC terminology, the director is called the transaction manager.

By default, the Microsoft Distributed Transaction Coordinator (MSDTC) service is installed with Windows 2000. It cannot be uninstalled through Add/Remove Programs.

== See also ==
- Microsoft Transaction Server
- List of Microsoft Windows components
- Kernel Transaction Manager
- Windows Vista I/O technologies
