= Transactional NTFS =

Microsoft Windows component

Transactional NTFS (abbreviated TxF) is a component introduced in Windows Vista and present in later versions of the Microsoft Windows operating system that brings the concept of atomic transactions to the NTFS file system, allowing Windows application developers to write file-output routines that are guaranteed to either succeed completely or to fail completely. Major operating system components, including System Restore, Task Scheduler, and Windows Update, rely on TxF for stability. During the development of Windows Vista, WinFS also relied on TxF for storing files.

Due to its complexity and various nuances which developers need to consider as part of application development, Microsoft has deprecated TxF and stated that it may be removed in a future version of Windows. Microsoft has strongly recommended that developers investigate using the alternatives rather than adopting the Transactional NTFS API platform which may not be available in future versions of Windows.

== Overview ==
Transactional NTFS allows for files and directories to be created, modified, renamed, and deleted atomically. Using transactions ensures correctness of operation; in a series of file operations (done as a transaction), the operation will be committed if all the operations succeed. In case of any failure, the entire operation will roll back and fail.

Transactional NTFS is implemented on top of the Kernel Transaction Manager, which is a Windows kernel component introduced in Windows Vista that provides transactioning of objects in the kernel. The NTFS file system already supports journaling of low-level operations, such as writing a block of data. Transactional NTFS expands on this capability to include:

- Atomic operations on a single file: A common example of this is saving a file from an application; if the application or machine were to crash while writing the file, then only part of the file could be written, possibly resulting in a corrupted file. This would be a very significant problem if a previous version of the file was being over-written, as data would likely be lost.
- Atomic operations spanning multiple files: If an application needs to update several files at once with a set of changes, all the necessary file operations can be performed as a single transaction, preventing inconsistent updates in the event of a failure.
- Atomic operations spanning multiple computers: Performing the same operation on multiple computers is a fairly common administrative task in a corporate network; Transactional NTFS integrates with the Distributed Transaction Coordinator to ensure that the change is successfully applied to all machines.

With the exception of read operations, using Transactional NTFS for transactions on Encrypting File System files is not supported in Windows Vista until Service Pack 1 and Windows Server 2008.

== See also ==
- ACID
- Features new to Windows Vista
- Technical features new to Windows Vista
