= DevSlp =

Low-power feature in some SATA devices

DevSlp or DevSleep (sometimes referred to as device sleep or SATA DEVSLP) is a feature in some SATA devices which allows them to go into a low power "device sleep" mode when sent the appropriate signal, which uses one or two orders of magnitude less power than a traditional idle (about 5 mW, but some drives can get as low as 2.5 mW). The feature was introduced by SanDisk in a partnership with Intel. Some think that the initiative could make laptops feel like they power on basically instantaneously, while others state that this means that laptops can stay on all the time, and always be available with no adverse effects on battery life.

In traditional low-power modes, SATA link still needs to remain powered on to allow the device to receive a wake-up command. With DevSlp, rarely used 3.3 V pins of the SATA power plug will be used for the DevSlp signal instead of providing 3.3 V power. This signal can wake up the drive, and it will allow SATA link to be shut down, reducing further the power consumption.

Due to the way they work, DevSleep-enabled drives may not be suitable for most desktop PCs and some notebooks with the 3.3 V voltage present in their SATA power connectors; the presence of 3.3 V results in DevSleep-enabled drives remaining in DevSlp state. An incompatibility between a desktop mainboard and a SATA SSD may be resolved by disabling the DevSleep feature using a power connector adapter that does not pass the +3.3 V line.
