= MPEG-4 SL =

Synchronization Layer
- Developed by: ISO

MPEG-4 SL, the MPEG-4 synchronization layer, manages the identification of access units like video or audio frames, and scene description commands and the time stamping of them independent of the media type within elementary streams to enable synchronization among them.

== See also ==
- MPEG-4
