= Kernel Transaction Manager =

Operating system component

- Developer: Microsoft
- Operating system: Microsoft Windows
- Type: Operating system kernel component
- License: Proprietary commercial software
- Website: docs.microsoft.com/en-us/windows/win32/ktm/kernel-transaction-manager-portal

Kernel Transaction Manager (KTM) is a component of the Windows operating system kernel in Windows Vista and Windows Server 2008 that enables applications to use atomic transactions on resources by making them available as kernel objects.

== Overview ==
The transaction engine, which operates in kernel mode, allows for transactions on both kernel mode and user mode resources, as well as among distributed resources. The Kernel Transaction Manager intends to make it easy for application developers to do much error recovery, virtually transparently, with KTM acting as a transaction manager that transaction clients can plug into. Those transaction clients can be third-party clients that want to initiate transactions on resources that are managed by Transaction Resource Manager. The resource managers can also be third-party or built into the system.

KTM is used to implement Transactional NTFS (TxF) and Transactional Registry (TxR). KTM relies on the Common Log File System (CLFS) for its operation. CLFS is a general-purpose log-file subsystem designed for creating data and event logs.
