= Transport Driver Interface =

The Transport Driver Interface or TDI is the protocol understood by the upper edge of the Transport layer of the Microsoft Windows kernel network stack.

Transport Providers are implementations of network protocols such as TCP/IP, NetBIOS, and AppleTalk.

When user-mode binaries are created by compiling and linking, an entity called a TDI client is linked into the binary. TDI clients are provided with the compiler. The user-mode binary uses the user-mode API of whatever network protocol is being used, which in turn causes the TDI client to emit TDI commands into the Transport Provider.

Typical TDI commands are TDI_SEND, TDI_CONNECT, TDI_RECEIVE.

The purpose of the Transport Driver Interface is to provide an abstraction layer, permitting simplification of the TDI clients.

== See also ==
- Windows Vista networking technologies
