= Windows Driver Frameworks =

Set of Microsoft tools and libraries

Windows Driver Frameworks (WDF)
- Other names: Windows Driver Foundation
- Developer: Microsoft
- Stable release: win-10.0.22621.1 / 11 November 2022; 3 years ago
- Operating system: Microsoft Windows
- Type: Development tool, application programming interface
- License: MIT License
- Website: learn.microsoft.com/en-us/windows-hardware/drivers/wdf/
- Repository: github.com/Microsoft/Windows-Driver-Frameworks

Windows Driver Frameworks (WDF, formerly Windows Driver Foundation), is a set of Microsoft tools and libraries that aid in the creation of device drivers for Windows 2000 and later versions of Windows NT. It complements Windows Driver Model, abstracting away much of the boilerplate complexity in writing Windows drivers. Windows Vista and later are included WDF natively; for Windows 2000 and Windows XP, the WDF update is available.

WDF consists of Kernel-Mode Driver Framework (KMDF) and User-Mode Driver Framework (UMDF). These individual frameworks provide a new object-oriented programming model for Windows driver development. The primary goals of WDF is conceptual scalability and reduced duplication, enabling developers to apply the same concepts across different driver types and reducing the code overhead required for drivers. This differs markedly from the Windows Driver Model (WDM) which requires driver developers to be fully familiar with many complex technical details to write a basic driver.

Part of the key to achieving conceptual scalability is that KMDF and UMDF use an "opt-in" model. This model allows the developer to extend and override the default behavior of a canonical "good driver". In contrast, Windows Driver Model depends on the driver writer to implement all aspects of the driver's behavior.

== Varieties ==
There are three types of WDF drivers:

- Kernel-Mode Driver Framework, for writing standard kernel-mode device drivers
- User-Mode Driver Framework v1, for writing user-mode drivers using a C++ COM-based API
- User-Mode Driver Framework v2, for writing user-mode drivers with syntactic parity to KMDF

WDF also includes a set of static verification tools for use by driver writers. These tools examine driver code for common errors and/or simulate the code of a driver in order to identify problems that are both difficult to detect and difficult to test for.

== Versions ==
KMDF version history
Operating system	KMDF 1.0	KMDF 1.1	KMDF 1.5	KMDF 1.7	KMDF 1.9	KMDF 1.11	KMDF 1.13	KMDF 1.15	KMDF 1.17	KMDF 1.19	KMDF 1.21	KMDF 1.23	KMDF 1.25	KMDF 1.27	KMDF 1.29	KMDF 1.31	KMDF 1.33
Windows 11, 21H2	Compatible	Compatible	Compatible	Compatible	Compatible	Compatible	Compatible	Compatible	Compatible	Compatible	Compatible	Compatible	Compatible	Compatible	Compatible	Compatible	Built-in
Windows 10, 2004	Compatible	Compatible	Compatible	Compatible	Compatible	Compatible	Compatible	Compatible	Compatible	Compatible	Compatible	Compatible	Compatible	Compatible	Compatible	Built-in	—N/a
Windows 10, 1903	Compatible	Compatible	Compatible	Compatible	Compatible	Compatible	Compatible	Compatible	Compatible	Compatible	Compatible	Compatible	Compatible	Compatible	Built-in	—N/a	—N/a
Windows 10, 1809	Compatible	Compatible	Compatible	Compatible	Compatible	Compatible	Compatible	Compatible	Compatible	Compatible	Compatible	Compatible	Compatible	Built-in	—N/a	—N/a	—N/a
Windows 10, 1803	Compatible	Compatible	Compatible	Compatible	Compatible	Compatible	Compatible	Compatible	Compatible	Compatible	Compatible	Compatible	Built-in	—N/a	—N/a	—N/a	—N/a
Windows 10, 1709	Compatible	Compatible	Compatible	Compatible	Compatible	Compatible	Compatible	Compatible	Compatible	Compatible	Compatible	Built-in	—N/a	—N/a	—N/a	—N/a	—N/a
Windows 10, 1703	Compatible	Compatible	Compatible	Compatible	Compatible	Compatible	Compatible	Compatible	Compatible	Compatible	Built-in	—N/a	—N/a	—N/a	—N/a	—N/a	—N/a
Windows 10, 1607	Compatible	Compatible	Compatible	Compatible	Compatible	Compatible	Compatible	Compatible	Compatible	Built-in	—N/a	—N/a	—N/a	—N/a	—N/a	—N/a	—N/a
Windows 10, 1511	Compatible	Compatible	Compatible	Compatible	Compatible	Compatible	Compatible	Compatible	Built-in	—N/a	—N/a	—N/a	—N/a	—N/a	—N/a	—N/a	—N/a
Windows 10, 1507	Compatible	Compatible	Compatible	Compatible	Compatible	Compatible	Compatible	Built-in	—N/a	—N/a	—N/a	—N/a	—N/a	—N/a	—N/a	—N/a	—N/a
Windows 8.1	Compatible	Compatible	Compatible	Compatible	Compatible	Compatible	Built-in	—N/a	—N/a	—N/a	—N/a	—N/a	—N/a	—N/a	—N/a	—N/a	—N/a
Windows 8	Compatible	Compatible	Compatible	Compatible	Compatible	Built-in	—N/a	—N/a	—N/a	—N/a	—N/a	—N/a	—N/a	—N/a	—N/a	—N/a	—N/a
Windows 7	Compatible	Compatible	Compatible	Compatible	Built-in	Update	—N/a	—N/a	—N/a	—N/a	—N/a	—N/a	—N/a	—N/a	—N/a	—N/a	—N/a
Windows Server 2008	Compatible	Compatible	Compatible	Built-in	Update	Update	—N/a	—N/a	—N/a	—N/a	—N/a	—N/a	—N/a	—N/a	—N/a	—N/a	—N/a
Windows Vista	Compatible	Compatible	Built-in	Update	Update	Update	—N/a	—N/a	—N/a	—N/a	—N/a	—N/a	—N/a	—N/a	—N/a	—N/a	—N/a
Windows Server 2003	Compatible	Update	Update	Update	Update	—N/a	—N/a	—N/a	—N/a	—N/a	—N/a	—N/a	—N/a	—N/a	—N/a	—N/a	—N/a
Windows XP	Update	Update	Update	Update	Update	—N/a	—N/a	—N/a	—N/a	—N/a	—N/a	—N/a	—N/a	—N/a	—N/a	—N/a	—N/a
Windows 2000	Update	Update	Update	Update	—N/a	—N/a	—N/a	—N/a	—N/a	—N/a	—N/a	—N/a	—N/a	—N/a	—N/a	—N/a	—N/a

UMDF version history
Operating system	UMDF 1.5	UMDF 1.7	UMDF 1.9	UMDF 1.11	UMDF 2.0	UMDF 2.15	UMDF 2.17	UMDF 2.19	UMDF 2.21	UMDF 2.23	UMDF 2.25	UMDF 2.27	UMDF 2.29	UMDF 2.31	UMDF 2.33
Windows 11, 21H2	Compatible	Compatible	Compatible	Compatible	Compatible	Compatible	Compatible	Compatible	Compatible	Compatible	Compatible	Compatible	Compatible	Compatible	Built-in
Windows 10, 2004	Compatible	Compatible	Compatible	Compatible	Compatible	Compatible	Compatible	Compatible	Compatible	Compatible	Compatible	Compatible	Compatible	Built-in	—N/a
Windows 10, 1903	Compatible	Compatible	Compatible	Compatible	Compatible	Compatible	Compatible	Compatible	Compatible	Compatible	Compatible	Compatible	Built-in	—N/a	—N/a
Windows 10, 1809	Compatible	Compatible	Compatible	Compatible	Compatible	Compatible	Compatible	Compatible	Compatible	Compatible	Compatible	Built-in	—N/a	—N/a	—N/a
Windows 10, 1803	Compatible	Compatible	Compatible	Compatible	Compatible	Compatible	Compatible	Compatible	Compatible	Compatible	Built-in	—N/a	—N/a	—N/a	—N/a
Windows 10, 1709	Compatible	Compatible	Compatible	Compatible	Compatible	Compatible	Compatible	Compatible	Compatible	Built-in	—N/a	—N/a	—N/a	—N/a	—N/a
Windows 10, 1703	Compatible	Compatible	Compatible	Compatible	Compatible	Compatible	Compatible	Compatible	Built-in	—N/a	—N/a	—N/a	—N/a	—N/a	—N/a
Windows 10, 1607	Compatible	Compatible	Compatible	Compatible	Compatible	Compatible	Compatible	Built-in	—N/a	—N/a	—N/a	—N/a	—N/a	—N/a	—N/a
Windows 10, 1511	Compatible	Compatible	Compatible	Compatible	Compatible	Compatible	Built-in	—N/a	—N/a	—N/a	—N/a	—N/a	—N/a	—N/a	—N/a
Windows 10, 1507	Compatible	Compatible	Compatible	Compatible	Compatible	Built-in	—N/a	—N/a	—N/a	—N/a	—N/a	—N/a	—N/a	—N/a	—N/a
Windows 8.1	Compatible	Compatible	Compatible	Compatible	Built-in	—N/a	—N/a	—N/a	—N/a	—N/a	—N/a	—N/a	—N/a	—N/a	—N/a
Windows 8	Compatible	Compatible	Compatible	Built-in	—N/a	—N/a	—N/a	—N/a	—N/a	—N/a	—N/a	—N/a	—N/a	—N/a	—N/a
Windows 7	Compatible	Compatible	Built-in	Update	—N/a	—N/a	—N/a	—N/a	—N/a	—N/a	—N/a	—N/a	—N/a	—N/a	—N/a
Windows Server 2008	Compatible	Built-in	Update	Update	—N/a	—N/a	—N/a	—N/a	—N/a	—N/a	—N/a	—N/a	—N/a	—N/a	—N/a
Windows Vista SP1	Compatible	Built-in	Update	Update	—N/a	—N/a	—N/a	—N/a	—N/a	—N/a	—N/a	—N/a	—N/a	—N/a	—N/a
Windows Vista	Built-in	Update	Update	Update	—N/a	—N/a	—N/a	—N/a	—N/a	—N/a	—N/a	—N/a	—N/a	—N/a	—N/a
Windows Server 2003	Update	Update	Update	—N/a	—N/a	—N/a	—N/a	—N/a	—N/a	—N/a	—N/a	—N/a	—N/a	—N/a	—N/a
Windows XP	Update	Update	Update	—N/a	—N/a	—N/a	—N/a	—N/a	—N/a	—N/a	—N/a	—N/a	—N/a	—N/a	—N/a

== See also ==
- Windows Driver Kit
