= MDOP =

MDOP may refer to:

- Malicious Destruction of Property
- Microsoft Desktop Optimization Pack
