= Microsoft Desktop Optimization Pack =

- Original author: Microsoft
- Release: 1 April 2008; 14 years ago
- Stable release: 2015 / 17 August 2015; 7 years ago
- Platform: IA-32 and x86-64
- Type: System software
- License: Proprietary commercial software; available through volume licensing or MSDN subscription
- Website: partner.microsoft.com/solutions/mdop

Microsoft Desktop Optimization Pack (MDOP) is a suite of utilities for Microsoft Windows customers who have subscribed to Microsoft Software Assurance program. It aims at bringing easier manageability and monitoring of enterprise desktops, emergency recovery, desktop virtualization and application virtualization.

== Components ==
The MDOP suite is grouped into 3 overall technologies: Virtualize, Manage and Restore

=== Virtualize ===
==== Microsoft Application Virtualization (App-V) ====
An application virtualization and application streaming platform that allows clients to run applications locally via on demand streaming from a centralized server. This makes sure that all clients run the application with the same configuration. App-V also allows standalone virtualized applications to run locally on the client. Starting with Windows 10 Anniversary Update, the App-V client became part of Windows 10 and is no longer included in MDOP. The App-V Sequencer became part of the Windows Assessment and Deployment Kit.

==== Microsoft User Experience Virtualization (UE-V) ====
A replacement for roaming profiles that will allow user preferences and settings to roam between different environments and types of devices. Starting with Windows 10 Anniversary Update, this item became part of Windows 10 and is no longer included in MDOP. The template generator for Microsoft UE-V became a part of the Windows Assessment and Deployment Kit (Windows ADK).

==== Microsoft Enterprise Desktop Virtualization (MED-V) ====
A desktop virtualization solution: It allows a physical Windows 7 workstation to host one or more virtual machines that run their own operating systems on a Windows Virtual PC hypervisor, with some transparent integration of the Start Menu and desktop of the virtual machine into that of the host. Microsoft advertises MED-V as a compatibility solution that allows enterprises to run legacy applications that will not run natively on Windows 7 to be hosted on a legacy platform such as Windows XP, similarly to the consumer-oriented Windows XP Mode.

=== Manage ===
==== Microsoft Advanced Group Policy Management (AGPM) ====
Provides enhanced management capabilities for group policy. It integrates with the Group Policy Configuration MMC snap-in and adds change control, offline editing, and delegation capabilities. Change control tracks and manages changes to Group Policy Objects (GPOs). It presents a virtual vault which houses the GPOs. To make any changes, a GPO must be checked out of the vault and the changed version checked in. The system enforces the latest version of the GPO and archives the older version, which can be restored back if need arises. Offline editing capabilities allow GPOs to be edited without a live connection to the network and Active Directory. The changes are merged on the next connection. AGPM also adds delegation capability, where the responsibility of managing the Group Policy can be divided among different administrators. Each administrator is concerned with only a certain set of GPOs, which can then be administered independent of others. Optionally, it can be configured so that changes are reviewed by other administrators before being applied. Advanced Group Policy Management is based on GPOVault, a product by DesktopStandard Corporation which Microsoft acquired in October 2006.

==== Microsoft BitLocker Administration and Monitoring (MBAM) ====
A tool for managing, enforcing and monitoring BitLocker drive encryption across an entire organization from a central location. MBAM consists of administration console which can be accessed using a web browser, as well as an agent which must be installed on every computer in the organization, either manually or using Active Directory.

=== Restore ===
Screenshot of Microsoft Diagnostics and Recovery Toolset, one of the components of this software suite

Microsoft Diagnostics and Recovery Toolset (DaRT), formerly Emergency Repair Disk Commander (ERD Commander), is a set of tools that helps diagnose an offline copy of Microsoft Windows. It comes on a bootable disc and is run during computer startup. It can uninstall installed hotfixes, perform crash analysis, recover deleted files and access System Restore's restore checkpoints on the offline operating system in an environment similar to Windows graphical user interface.

Microsoft DaRT is a successor of ERD Commander, which was part of the Winternals Administrator Pack from Winternals. ERD Commander later became a Microsoft property with its acquisition of Winternals on 17 July 2006.

Microsoft DaRT is based on the Windows Preinstallation Environment. The tool set includes:

- Registry Editor: Edits Windows Registry
- Locksmith: Resets a user account's password
- Crash Analyzer: Analyzes crash dumps
- File Restore: Restores deleted files
- Disk Commander: Repairs volumes, master boot records and partitions
- Disk Wipe: Irrecoverably erases data from hard disk
- Computer Management: A group of utilities that help retrieve system information, enable, disable or manage device drivers, Windows services and software that run during computer startup, inspect the event logs of the offline system and manage partitions.
- Explorer: A file manager
- Solution Wizard: A guidance tool that helps user choose the proper repair tool
- TCP/IP Config: Displays and modifies TCP/IP configuration
- Hotfix Uninstall: Uninstalls Windows hotfixes
- SFC Scan: Revives corrupted or deleted system files by copying them from the Windows installation source
- Search: Searches a disk for files
- Defender (formerly Standalone System Sweeper): An antivirus that scans a system for malware, rootkits, and potentially unwanted software. Uses the same engine as Microsoft Security Essentials and other Microsoft antivirus products.

ERD Commander originally included more tools, including a web browser.

For Windows 10, DaRT 10 was released. Starting with Windows 10, the Windows Assessment and Deployment Kit (Windows ADK) became a prerequisite for certain components of DaRT such as the DaRT Recovery Image Wizard. To use the Crash Analyzer tool in DaRT 10 and debug symbols, Debugging Tools for Windows 10 are a requirement, available in the Windows 10 SDK. The DaRT 10 toolset ISO is available to Software Assurance customers.

== Releases ==
Title	Date	Ref.
MDOP 2007	2 July 2007	
MDOP 2008	1 April 2008	
MDOP 2008 R2	15 September 2008	
MDOP 2009	1 April 2009	
MDOP 2009 R2	20 October 2009	
MDOP 2010	22 February 2010	
MDOP 2010 Refresh	1 April 2010	
MDOP 2011	9 March 2011	
MDOP 2011 R2	1 August 2011	
MDOP 2012	1 November 2012	
MDOP 2013	9 April 2013	
MDOP 2013 R2	2 December 2013	
MDOP 2014	30 April 2014	
MDOP 2014 R2	4 December 2014	
MDOP 2015	17 August 2015	

Starting with Windows 10, updated service releases for MDOP components are available on the Microsoft Download Center. In each service release, all components are not updated.
