= Zebtab =

- Developer: Zebtab
- Stable release: 1.8 / April 7, 2008
- Operating system: Vista, Windows XP and Windows 2000
- License: Freeware
- Website: www.zebtab.com

Zebtab is an aggregated desktop gadget which delivers and alerts users with sports, entertainment and news content direct to the desktop. The content is delivered in the form of images, text, video and podcasts giving a rich multimedia experience. Users can add or remove channels to reflect their interests by selecting from the list in the My Zebtab tab. Individual channels can be personalised further ensuring relevant content is delivered.

The most popular channels on Zebtab are Manchester United and Setanta Sports.

== Technology ==
Zebtab is a downloadable application for PC's, built on Microsoft .Net technology, utilising RSS technologies and the ClickOnce installer.

== Company ==
Zebtab is a registered trademark of Zebtab Ltd, based in London. The company is part of the Microsoft Accelerator Programme. Zebtab won the Red Herring 100 Award 08, which advocates the most promising private ventures in Europe. Zebtab was selected as one of the 20 most exciting UK tech companies to visit Silicon Valley in Apr 08 as part of the Web Mission. KillerStartups featured Zebtab in its list of promising startup companies.
