= Magnifier (Windows) =

Screen magnifier software

- Magnifier's lens mode on Windows 11
- Developer: Microsoft
- Included with: Windows 98 and later
- Type: Screen magnification application

Magnifier, formerly Microsoft Magnifier, is a screen magnifier app intended for visually impaired people to use when running Microsoft Windows. When it is running, it creates a bar at the top of the screen that greatly magnifies where the mouse is. Magnifier was first included as a sample in the Active Accessibility SDK/RDK for Windows 95 and later made a standard Windows utility starting with Windows 98. Prior to Windows Vista, Magnifier could be used to magnify the screen up to 9 times its normal size. Windows Vista and later allow up to 16× magnification.

In Windows Vista, Magnifier uses WPF, which in turn uses vector images to render the content. As a result, the rendered magnified image is sharp and not pixelated. However, this is useful only for Windows Presentation Foundation applications. Non-WPF applications are still magnified the traditional way. Also, due to a change introduced in WPF 3.5 SP1, this functionality is lost if .NET Framework 3.5 SP1 is installed.

Microsoft has also released a Magnification API to allow assistive technology applications to use the Magnifier engine.

Microsoft's Windows 7 operating system includes a significantly improved version of Magnifier. It features full-screen magnification which allows a user to pan around the screen at up to 16× magnification.

The Windows 10 icon of Magnifier

However, the full screen feature has also been criticized due to its incompatibility with the high contrast color schemes found in the Windows 7 beta release. This issue remains in the final Windows 7 release. Besides this, when the magnifier zooms, the text will appear blurry or pixelated because it is not being directly rendered at the larger size; instead, the smaller sized rendering is being enlarged as a raster image. ClearType sub-pixel anti-aliasing is also magnified as a result of this, so if ClearType is active, the magnified text may appear to have unexpected colors at the edges of non-horizontal lines. Some third party magnification software compensates for this effect by applying scaling filters to the enlarged image.

The magnifier also features a lens mode similar to that found in the existing version of the software. Lens mode is improved, however, as now the magnifying window will follow the cursor around the screen rather than remain in a fixed position. Finally the magnifier is much easier to access by using the Windows key and +/- to control the zoom level without the need to start the application first. Pressing the Win+Esc combination will exit the magnifier.
