= ClickOnce =

Component of Microsoft .NET Framework 2.0 and later

Installation of a ClickOnce application

ClickOnce is a component of Microsoft .NET Framework 2.0 and later, and supports deploying applications made with Windows Forms or Windows Presentation Foundation. It is similar to Java Web Start for the Java Platform or Zero Install for Linux.

== Description ==
The core principle of ClickOnce is to ease the deployment of Windows applications. In addition, ClickOnce aims to solve three other problems with conventional deployment models: the difficulty in updating a deployed application, the impact of an application on the user's computer, and the need for administrator permissions to install applications.

ClickOnce-deployed applications are considered "low impact", in that they are installed per user, not per machine. Administrator privileges are not required to install these applications. Each ClickOnce application is isolated from the others. This means one ClickOnce application is not able to "break" another. ClickOnce employs Code Access Security (CAS) to prevent system functions being called by a ClickOnce application from the web, ensuring the security of data and the client system in general.

== Applications ==
The ClickOnce model supports both installed applications (akin to conventional Windows applications with Start Menu integration) and online applications (browser-hosted applications that are not installed, only run and cached). ClickOnce applications can be deployed to a computer from an internet location, a network share, or a local file location such as a CD-ROM.

The ClickOnce deployment technology has been integrated into Visual Studio 2005 and later. It is also natively supported by MSBuild, Microsoft's build management technology.

== Manifests ==
A ClickOnce deployment is controlled through the use of two XML manifest files: a deployment manifest and an application manifest. The manifests are in the same XML format as the side-by-side assembly implementation. The deployment manifest (*.application file) describes the deployment model: the current version, update behavior, publisher identity along with a digital signature; this manifest is intended to be authored by administrators who handle deployment. The application manifest (*.exe.manifest file) describes the application assemblies, dependent libraries, and permissions required by the application. This file is intended to be authored by the application developer. In order to launch a ClickOnce application, a user clicks on its deployment manifest file.

Currently, ClickOnce will only launch if the URL to the deployment manifest is opened using Internet Explorer or Edge. If the deployment URL is launched from another application such as Outlook, Word, or Excel, the application launch will only be successful if Internet Explorer or Edge is set as the default browser.

== Updates ==
ClickOnce applications can be self-updating. They can check for newer versions as they become available and automatically replace any updated files. Depending on the installation type, ClickOnce presents several update options. Applications can be configured to check for updates on startup or after startup. ClickOnce also exposes programmatic APIs to customize update behavior. There is also support for mandatory updates, ensuring that the entire user-base can be moved to a new version in a timely manner.

== Browser support ==
Native support for ClickOnce applications is only available via Internet Explorer and Edge.

With the release of .NET Framework 3.5 with Service Pack 1, Microsoft included a Firefox add-on called .NET Framework Assistant that enabled ClickOnce support in Firefox 3 and later. The first release of this extension had a problem that prevented users from uninstalling the add-on in the same manner that other add-ons are uninstalled; the corresponding Uninstall button in the Add-ons dialog box was disabled. On 6 May 2009, Microsoft released an update that addressed this problem and also published a support article that helped users manually remove this component. In addition, the later versions of Microsoft .NET Framework Assistant included with Windows 7 and .NET Framework 4 did not have this issue.

Other browsers may have third-party extensions available that add ClickOnce support such as Menarva Ltd's ClickOnce for Google Chrome.

== See also ==
- XAML Browser Applications (XBAP)
