= Video file format =

File format for storing digital video data

A video file format is a type of file format for storing digital video data on a computer system. Video is almost always stored using lossy compression to reduce the file size.

A video file normally consists of a container (e.g. in the Matroska format) containing visual (video without audio) data in a video coding format (e.g. VP9) alongside audio data in an audio coding format (e.g. Opus). The container can also contain synchronization information, subtitles, and metadata such as title. A standardized (or in some cases de facto standard) video file type such as .webm is a profile specified by a restriction on which container format and which video and audio compression formats are allowed.

The coded video and audio inside a video file container (i.e. not headers, footers, and metadata) is called the essence. A program (or hardware) which can decode compressed video or audio is called a codec; playing or encoding a video file will sometimes require the user to install a codec library corresponding to the type of video and audio coding used in the file.

Good design normally dictates that a file extension enables the user to derive which program will open the file. That is the case with some video file formats, such as WebM (.webm), Windows Media Video (.wmv), Flash Video (.flv), and Ogg Video (.ogv), each of which can only contain a few well-defined subtypes of video and audio coding formats, making it relatively easy to know which codec will play the file. In contrast to that, some very general-purpose container types like AVI (.avi) and QuickTime (.mov) can contain video and audio in almost any format, and have file extensions named after the container type, making it very hard for the end user to use the file extension to derive which codec or program to use to play the files.

The free software FFmpeg project's libraries have very wide support for encoding and decoding video file formats. For example, Google uses ffmpeg to support a wide range of upload video formats for YouTube. One widely used media player using the ffmpeg libraries is the free software VLC media player, which can play most video files that end users will encounter.

== List of video file formats ==
Name	File extension(s)	Container format	Video coding format(s)	Audio coding format(s)	Notes
WebM	.webm	Matroska	VP8, VP9, AV1	Vorbis, Opus	Royalty-free format created for HTML video.
Matroska	.mkv	Matroska	Any	Any	
Flash Video (FLV)	.flv	FLV	VP6, Sorenson Spark, Screen video, Screen video 2, H.264	MP3, ADPCM, Nellymoser, Speex, AAC	Use of the H.264 and AAC compression formats in the FLV file format has some limitations and authors of Flash Player strongly encourage everyone to embrace the new standard F4V file format de facto standard for web-based streaming video (over RTMP).
F4V	.flv	MPEG-4 Part 12	H.264	MP3, AAC	Replacement for FLV.
Vob	.vob	VOB	H.262/MPEG-2 Part 2 or MPEG-1 Part 2	PCM, DTS, MPEG-1, Audio Layer II (MP2), or Dolby Digital (AC-3)	Files in VOB format have .vob filename extension and are typically stored in the VIDEO_TS folder at the root of a DVD. The VOB format is based on the MPEG program stream format.
Ogg Video	.ogv, .ogg	Ogg	Theora, Dirac	Vorbis, FLAC	
Dirac	.drc	?	Dirac	?	
Video alternative to GIF	.gifv	HTML	Any	none	Not standardized, and not a real video file in the classical meaning since it merely references the real video file (e.g. a .webm file), which has to exist separately elsewhere. A .gifv "file" is simply a HTML webpage which includes a HTML video tag, where the video has no sound. As there were large communities online which create art using the medium of short soundless videos in GIF format, GIFV was created as a functionally similar replacement with vastly smaller filesizes than the inefficient GIF format.
Multiple-image Network Graphics	.mng	—N/a	—N/a	none	Inefficient, not widely used.
AVI	.avi	AVI	Any	Any	Uses RIFF
MPEG Transport Stream	.mts, .m2ts, .ts	AVCHD	AVCHD (MPEG-4 / H.264)	Dolby AC-3 or uncompressed linear PCM	The standard video format used by many Sony and Panasonic HD camcorders. It is also used for storing high definition video on Blu-ray discs.
QuickTime File Format	.mov, .qt	QuickTime	many	AAC, MP3, others	
Windows Media Video	.wmv	ASF	Windows Media Video, Windows Media Video Screen, Windows Media Video Image	Windows Media Audio, Sipro ACELP.net	
Raw video format	.yuv	Further documentation needed	Doesn't apply	Doesn't apply	Supports all resolutions, sampling structures, and frame rates
RealMedia (RM)	.rm	RealMedia	RealVideo	RealAudio	Made for RealPlayer
RealMedia Variable Bitrate (RMVB)	.rmvb	RealMedia Variable Bitrate	RealVideo	RealAudio	Made for RealPlayer
VivoActive (VIV)	.viv	VIV	based upon H.263 video	G.723 ADPCM audio (not the G.723.1 speech codec)	Made for VivoActive Player
Advanced Systems Format (ASF)	.asf	ASF	Any	Any	
AMV video format	.amv	Modified version of AVI	Variant of Motion JPEG	Variant of IMA, ADPCM	Proprietary video file format produced for MP4 players and S1 MP3 players with video playback
MPEG-4 Part 14 (MP4)	.mp4, .m4p (with DRM), .m4v	MPEG-4 Part 12	H.264, H.265, MPEG-4 Part 2, MPEG-2, MPEG-1	Advanced Audio Coding, MP3, others	
MPEG-1	.mpg, .mp2, .mpeg, .mpe, .mpv	MPEG-1 part 1	MPEG-1 part 2	MPEG-1 Audio Layer I, MPEG-1 Audio Layer III (MP3)	Old, but very widely used due to installed base.
MPEG-2 – Video	.mpg, .mpeg, .m2v	?	H.262	AAC, MP3, MPEG-2 Part 3, others	
M4V	.m4v	MPEG-4 Part 12	H.264	AAC, Dolby Digital	Developed by Apple, used in iTunes. Very similar to MP4 format, but may optionally have DRM.
SVI	.svi	MPEG-4 utilising a special header	?	?	Samsung video format for portable players
3GPP	.3gp	MPEG-4 Part 12	MPEG-4 Part 2, H.263, H.264	AMR-NB, AMR-WB, AMR-WB+, AAC-LC, HE-AAC v1 or Enhanced aacPlus (HE-AAC v2)	Common video format for cell phones
3GPP2	.3g2	MPEG-4 Part 12	MPEG-4 Part 2, H.263, H.264	AMR-NB, AMR-WB, AMR-WB+, AAC-LC, HE-AAC v1 or Enhanced aacPlus (HE-AAC v2), EVRC, SMV or VMR-WB	Common video format for cell phones
Material Exchange Format (MXF)	.mxf	MXF	?	?	
ROQ	.roq	?	?	?	used by Quake 3
Nullsoft Streaming Video (NSV)	.nsv	NSV	?	?	For streaming video content over the Internet
Flash Video (FLV)	.flv, .f4v, .f4p, .f4a .f4b	Audio, video, text, data	Adobe Flash Platform	SWF, F4V, ISO base media file format	Developed by the Adobe Flash Platform

== See also ==
- Comparison of video container formats
