= Free AVI Video Converter =

Free Video Converter
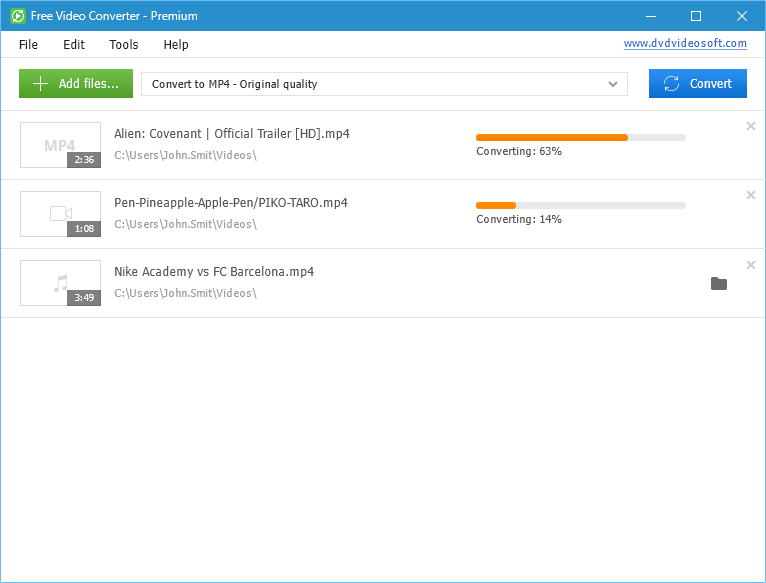
- Developer: DVDVideoSoft
- Stable release: 5.0.34.225 / 10 June 2013; 12 years ago
- Written in: C++ with Qt4, C#
- Operating system: Microsoft Windows
- Size: 31.94 MB
- Available in: 17 languages
- License: Proprietary
- Website: Official Webpage

Free Video Converter (earlier Free AVI Video Converter) is a free video conversion program developed by DVDVideoSoft. It is written in C++, and uses .NET Framework for its user interface.

== Overview ==
It is a freeware program, which converts video files from one video format to another, mainly to (Windows default) AVI format. AVI format support is better than in other (MP4/WebM etc.) DVDVideoSoft converters. Free Video Converter is distributed as a part of Free Studio and as a separate download.

The software is developed by DVDVideoSoft.

== Interface and features ==
Free Video Converter shares a basic interface style and background with other DVDVideoSoft's video converters. The applications supports drag-n-drop. By clicking Quality button output formats and output qualities are selected. Among the output video formats there is also audio format MP3, which is used to extract music from video files. By clicking the Magic Wand icon Preset Editor is started, a tool for changing any of the existing presets or creating a completely new one.

Program's options include a selection of themes for the program's interface and a single and a batch mode support. It is possible to add manually more information about output MP4 video and MP3 audio files or by default the program will automatically fill the title tag and the artwork, taking a snapshot from the middle of video which can be seen in iTunes, Winamp, Windows Explorer. The program supports encoding of media files by means of NVIDIA Cuda and ATI Stream technologies, which can boost conversion speed up to several times depending on hardware configuration.

== Supported formats ==
Input: .avi, .ivf, .div, .divx, .mpg, .mpeg, .mpe, .mp4, .m4v, .webm, .wmv, .asf, .mov, .qt, .mts, .m2t, .m2ts, .mod, .tod, .vro, .dat, .3gp2, .3gpp, .3gp, .3g2, .dvr-ms, .flv, .f4v, .amv, .rm, .rmm, .rv, .rmvb, .ogv, .mkv, .ts.

Output: .avi, .mp4, .wmv, .mkv, .flv, .swf, .mov, .m2ts, .webm, mp3.

== Operating system support ==
Free Video Converter runs under Windows XP/Vista/7/8/10 (but not Windows RT). If the version of .NET Framework installed doesn't meet the minimal requirements, then the setup assistant offers to install it from the Microsoft website.

== Languages ==
The software is available in the following languages: Brazilian Portuguese, Chinese Simplified, Chinese Traditional, Danish, Dutch, English, French, German, Greek, Italian, Japanese, Polish, Portuguese, Russian, Spanish, Swedish and Turkish.

== Criticism ==
Some versions of Free AVI Video Converter attempt to install a browser toolbar as well as changing a browser home page and search engine.

The free version adds a large freemake logo on top of the entire video, so you can't really use the video in most cases.

== See also ==
- Free Studio
- DVDVideoSoft
- Comparison of video converters
