= Hetman Partition Recovery =

- Developer: Hetman Software
- Stable release: 4.7 / 2023-03-29
- Operating system: Microsoft Windows
- Available in: Multilingual
- Type: Data recovery
- License: Shareware
- Website: hetmanrecovery.com

Hetman Partition Recovery is a shareware program for recovery of deleted data from hard drive partitions and other storage media. The utility supports both functioning disks and damaged logical partitions and recovers data from both reformatted disks and disks which have had their file system changed from FAT to NTFS or vice versa. In addition to working on existing partitions the tool can also find deleted logical drives, displaying them to the user for further search and recovery of deleted files as well as correcting errors in logical partition design. Hetman Partition Recovery supports reading of regular, zipped, and encrypted files, from disks formatted under NTFS and/or FAT file systems.

== Features ==
The utility supports FAT12/16/32, NTFS, and NTFS5 file systems and ensures recovery of basic file formats such as from Microsoft Office documents, spreadsheets and presentations (.docx/.doc, .xlsx/.xls and .pptx/.ppt respectively) and OpenDocument documents, spreadsheets and presentations (.odt, .ods, and .odp respectively, as well as .odg). The utility can also recover vector and raster digital images such as those in .jpg, .png, .psd, and .tiff formats as well as audio and video files in a variety of common and popular formats including .3gp, .aac, .asf, .avi, .flac, .flv, .m2ts, .m4v, .mkv, .mov, .mp3, .mp4, .mpeg, .mts, .ogg, .swf, .vob, .wav, .webm, .wma, and .wmv.

The utility can also recover digital archives such as those in the .7z, .arj, .cab, .gz, .img, .iso, .rar, and .zip formats, regardless of size or degree of compression.

== System requirements ==
- Processor with a clock speed of 1 GHz;
- RAM 512 MB;
- OS Microsoft Windows NT, Windows 98, Windows 2000, Windows XP, Windows Server 2003, Windows Server 2008, Windows Vista, Windows 7, Windows 8;
- Free disk space 42.9 MB.
