= Comparison of video container formats =

These tables compare features of multimedia container formats, most often used for storing or streaming digital video or digital audio content. To see which multimedia players support which container format, look at comparison of media players.

== General information ==
Containers related by derivation

In many ways, derived containers are similar to those on which they are based, sometimes extending them, sometimes limiting their capabilities.

- QTFF
  - ISO BMFF
    - MP4
    - 3GPP, 3GPP2
    - F4V
- MPEG-PS
  - MPEG-TS
    - M2TS
  - VOB
    - EVOB
- MCF
  - Matroska
    - WebM
- RIFF
  - AVI
    - DMF
- RM
  - RMVB

General information about video container formats
Format	Filename extension	Owner or creator	Initial release	License (Note: Indicates whether the standard is open or proprietary, patent-free or encumbered, whether royalty payments are required for streaming and codec implementation, and may indicate the availability of free tools for it.)	VBR audio	VFR	Hardware players	Streaming (Note: Indicates if the container can be used for a container bitstream, for example, for use as an RTP payload format. Some technologies, such as WebRTC, do not use any container formats for streaming. Some use fragmented MP4 (fMP4) or MPEG-TS segment files, such as HLS and MPEG-DASH.)	Metadata (Note: Tags.)	Chapters
Matroska	.mkv, .mk3d (Note: Also .mka for content that is primarily audio or .mks for subtitles only.)	CoreCodec (Note: Although CoreCodec, Inc. holds the copyrights and trademarks for the Matroska specification, the specifications are open to everybody. The source code of the libraries developed by the Matroska team is licensed under the LGPL and BSD licenses.)	2002-12	Freely licensed (Note: Anyone can use it or modify it for their own needs without paying any license or patents.)	Yes (Note: Matroska is designed to store VBR and VFR content.)	Yes	Yes (Note: Companies producing Matroska-supporting hardware include Asus, OPPO Digital, Samsung, and LG)	Yes (Note: Matroska can be streamed over HTTP and RTP/RTSP, through it is not meant to be streamed over RTP, as the two have duplicate features.)	Yes	Yes
MPEG-4 Part 14 (MP4)	.mp4, .m4v (Note: Also .m4a, .m4b or .m4p for audio-only content.)	MPEG	2001-10	Patent encumbered	Yes	Yes	Yes	Yes	Yes	Not standard (Note: There are two popular representations: text track (QuickTime), and userdata atom (Nero).)
QuickTime File Format (QTFF)	.mov, .qt	Apple Inc.	1991-12	Proprietary	Yes	Yes	Yes	Yes	Yes	Yes
Advanced Systems Format (ASF)	.asf, .wmv (Note: Also .wma for audio-only content.)	Microsoft	1996-09	Royalties on codecs (Note: License required from manufacturers or developers of codecs, but no license fees for the distribution of content.)	Yes	Yes	Yes	Yes	Yes	Yes
Audio Video Interleave (AVI)	.avi	Microsoft	1992-11	Proprietary	Yes (Note: ACM cannot handle VBR audio streams in AVI files. Thus, software using ACM to read audio from AVI files will not be able to handle VBR audio streams correctly, even though such files are compliant to the AVI file specification. This is a limitation of the ACM, not of the AVI file format.)	Yes (Note: Although AVI is not designed for variable framerates, it is possible to use them without creating a non-standard file by using 0-byte chunks for skipped frames. However, it requires the framerate to be set to the least common multiple of all framerates used, and produces slight overhead compared to true VFR.)	Yes	No	Yes	Needs alterations
Material Exchange Format (MXF)	.mxf	SMPTE	2004-09	Patent-free	Yes	Yes	No	Yes	Yes	No
MPEG program stream (PS)	.m2p, .ps (Note: The following extensions are also often used for an MPEG program or a transport stream: .mpg, .mpeg, .mpv, .m1v; also .mpa, .mp3, .mp2, .mp1, .m2a or .m1a for audio-only content.)	MPEG	1993-08	Patent-free	Yes	Yes (Note: MPEG-2 Part 1 specification, p. 64, sec. 2.6.3.)	Yes	No	No	No
MPEG transport stream (TS)	.ts, .tsv (Note: Also .tsa for audio-only content.)	MPEG	1995-07	Patent-free	Yes	Yes	Yes	Yes	No	No
BDAV MPEG-2 transport stream (M2TS)	.m2ts, .mts	BDA	2004-08	Patent encumbered	Yes	Yes	Yes	With DVB	Needs multiple files (Note: Blu-ray adopts a specific file structure. Simple title metadata are stored in the /BMDV/index.bdmv file.)	Needs multiple files (Note: Blu-ray adopts a specific file structure. Chapters require a companion .mpls file in the /BDMV/PLAYLIST/ directory.)
Video Object (VOB)	.vob	DVD Forum	1996-11	Patent encumbered	Yes	Yes	Yes	No	No	Needs multiple files (Note: VOB adopts a specific file structure to encode DVD content. Chapters and menus require a companion .ifo file.)
Enhanced VOB (EVO)	.evo	DVD Forum	2006-03	Patent encumbered	Yes	Yes	Yes	No	No	Needs multiple files (Note: EVO adopts a specific file structure to encode HD DVD content. Chapters require companion .xpl file.)
3GPP (3GP)	.3gp	3GPP	2003-04	Patent encumbered	Yes	Yes	Yes	Yes	Yes	No
3GPP2 (3G2)	.3g2	3GPP2	2004-01	Patent encumbered	Yes	Yes	Yes	Yes	Yes	No
Flash Video (F4V)	.f4v (Note: Also .f4a, .f4b and .f4p for audio-only content.)	Adobe Inc.	2007-12	Patent encumbered	Yes	Yes	Yes	Yes	Yes	Yes
Flash Video (FLV)	.flv	Adobe Inc.	2003-09	Proprietary	Yes (Note: Adobe Flash Video File Format Specification, p. 1. SWF File Format Specification, p. 188.)	Yes	Yes	With RTMP	Yes	Yes
Ogg	.ogv, .ogx (Note: Also .oga, .ogg or .opus for audio-only content.)	Xiph.Org	2003-05	Open source	Yes	Yes	Yes	Yes	Yes	As Vorbis comments (Note: Chapters stored as Vorbis comments are well supported by common tools such as FFmpeg and VLC.)
WebM	.webm	Google	2010-05	Royalty-free	Yes	Yes	Yes	Yes	Yes	Yes
RealMedia Variable Bitrate (RMVB)	.rmvb	RealNetworks	2003	Proprietary	Yes	Yes	Yes	Yes	Yes	No
DivX Media Format (DMF)	.divx	DivX, Inc.	2005-06	Proprietary	Yes	Yes	Yes	Yes	Yes	Yes

Support level legend: Full Indirect, lossless Partial Depends on setup None

Some features are only supported by a few containers:

- Attachments (additional files, such as fonts for subtitles) are only supported in Matroska, MP4 and QTFF. M2TS supports attachments as multiple files in a specific file structure: fonts for subtitles are in .otf files in the /BDMV/AUXDATA/ directory.
- Interactive menus are only supported in MP4, QTFF, M2TS, EVO and DMF. VOB supports interactive menus as multiple files in a specific file structure for encoding DVD content, requiring a companion .ifo file. Matroska has been planning to support interactive menus as part of a draft specification since 2004.
- Digital 3D is only supported at the container format level in Matroska, MXF and WebM (some stereo modes). M2TS supports Digital 3D as multiple files in a specific file structure for encoding stereoscopic video: MVC stereoscopic data is in .ssif files in the /BDMV/STREAM/SSIF/ directory and require a respective base .m2ts file. Digital 3D in QTFF and ASF is possible, but not standard. MP4 only supports Digital 3D at the video format level.

Some common multimedia file formats are not completely distinct container formats. Some are containers for specific audio and video coding formats, such as WebM, a subset of Matroska. Some are combinations of common container formats and audio and video coding profiles, such as AVCHD and DivX formats. Although sometimes compared to DivX products, Xvid is neither a container format nor a video format, it is a software library that encodes video using specific coding profiles of the common MPEG-4 ASP video format. Those types of restrictions are intended to simplify the construction of multimedia recorders and players.

== Video coding formats support ==
Video container support for video coding formats
Format	Type	Initial release	License	MKV	MP4	QTFF (Note: See the QuickTime File Format Specification and MP4RA's Entry Codes Registered for QuickTime.)	ASF	AVI (Note: AVI officially supports all codecs in the Media Foundation which is an evolution of VCM and ACM, both of which are now obsolete. Some older codecs used to be officially supported, and there are many known non-standard third-party extensions.)	MXF	PS, TS (Note: See the MPEG-2 Part 1 specification and registered TS identifiers.)	3GP, 3G2
MPEG-H HEVC (H.265)	Lossy or lossless	2013-06	Patent encumbered	Yes (Note: HEVC is mentioned in the latest (07) draft of Matroska, MKVToolNix and VLC already support it.)	Yes	Yes	Yes	Yes	Yes	Yes	Yes
MPEG-4 AVC (H.264)	Lossy or lossless	2004-08	Patent encumbered	Yes	Yes	Yes	Yes	Yes (Note: B-frames in an AVI file are a problem only for the ancient Video-for-Windows API, not for the AVI container itself.)	Yes	Yes	Yes
AV1	Lossy or lossless	2018-03	Patent claims	Yes	Yes	No	No	No	No	Planned	No
VP9	Lossy or lossless	2013-06	Patent claims	Yes	Yes	No	Yes	Yes	No	No	No
VP8	Lossy or lossless	2008-09	Patent claims	Yes	Yes	No	Yes	Yes	No	No	No
Dirac	Lossy or lossless	2008-03	Patent-free	VCM (Note: Matroska can support some codecs when wrapped in two specific Video for Windows data structures, VCM and ACM, but support outside Windows may be limited.)	No	Yes	No	Needs Dirac	No	Private	No
MVC	Stereoscopic	2009-05	Patent encumbered	Yes	No	No	No	No	No (Note: MVC is not covered by the latest iteration of the MXF standards.) (Note: MPEG, MXF, and SMPTE 381M, pp. 201-219.)	No	Yes
MPEG-1 Video	Lossy	1993-08	Expired patents	Yes	Yes	Yes	Yes	Yes	Yes	Yes	No
MPEG-2 Video	Lossy	1996-05	Expired patents	Yes	Yes	Yes	Yes	Yes	Yes	Yes	No
MPEG-4 Visual	Lossy	1999-12	Expired patents	Yes	Yes	First edition	Yes	Yes	Yes	Yes	Yes
Microsoft MPEG4 V2	Lossy	2003	Patent encumbered, proprietary	Yes	Not standard	Not standard	Yes	Yes	No	No	No
VC-1	Lossy	2006-02	Patent encumbered	VCM	Yes	Yes	Yes	Yes	Yes	No	No
H.263	Lossy	1996-03	Expired patents	No	Yes	Yes	Yes	Yes	No	No	Yes
Theora	Lossy	2004-06	Free license	Yes	No	No	No	Needs ffdshow	No	No	No
Cinepak	Lossy	1991	Proprietary	Yes	No	Yes	No	Yes	No	No	No
Sorenson	Lossy	1998-03	Proprietary	Yes	No	Versions 1 and 3	No	Version 1	No	No	No
RealVideo	Lossy	1997-02	Proprietary	RV10, RV20, RV30, RV40	RV60	No	No	Not standard	No	No	No
VP6	Lossy	2003-05	Proprietary	No	No	No	No	Needs VP6	No	No	No
DV	Intra-frame	1995	Proprietary	VCM	DVCPRO HD	DV 25	Yes	Yes	Yes (Note: DV, DVC Pro, and DVCam in MXF, pp. 166-172.)	No	No
M-JPEG	Intra-frame	1994-05	Expired patents	VCM	Yes	Yes	Yes	Yes	No	No	No
MJ2	Intra-frame	2003-12	Patent encumbered	No	Yes	No	No	Not standard	Yes	No	No
Apple ProRes	Intra-frame	2007-04	Proprietary	No	No	Yes	No	No	Yes	No	No
HuffYUV	Lossless	2000	Open source	VCM	No	No	No	Needs HuffYUV	No	No	No
YCbCr (Note: The digital YCbCr format is often informally called YUV, the analog format used as basis for it.)	Not compressed	1982	Patent-free	Yes	SheerVideo	Yes	Yes	Yes	Yes	No	No
Other	Other	—	Varies	—	—	DVC Pro 50, Photo JPEG, Graphics, QuickTime Animation	—	Indeo	—	JPEG 2000, TICO	—

Support level legend: Full Indirect, lossless Partial Depends on setup None

Some containers only support a restricted set of video formats:

- DMF only supports MPEG-4 Visual ASP with DivX profiles.
- EVO only supports MPEG-4 AVC, MPEG-1 Video, MPEG-2 Video and VC-1.
- F4V only supports MPEG-4 AVC, MPEG-4 Visual and H.263.
- FLV only supports MPEG-4 Visual, VP6, Sorenson Spark and Screen Video. MPEG-4 AVC in FLV is possible, but not standard. (Note: Adobe Flash Video File Format Specification, p. 72, sec. E.4.3.1; p. 1. SWF File Format Specification, Chapter 14: Video, pp. 204-218.)
- M2TS only supports MPEG-4 AVC, MPEG-1 Video, MPEG-2 Video, MPEG-4 Visual and VC-1.
- Ogg only supports Theora, MNG, JNG, (Note: Xiph has standardized the support for codecs in Ogg, but added support for more codecs afterwards.) PNG and Dirac. Firefox supports VP9 and VP8 in Ogg. VLC supports MPEG-2 Video, MPEG-4 Visual and VC-1 in Ogg.
- RMVB only supports RealVideo versions RV30, RV40 and RV60.
- VOB only supports MPEG-1 Video and MPEG-2 Video.
- WebM only supports VP9, VP8, and AV1.

== Audio coding formats support ==
Video container support for audio coding formats
Format	Type	Initial release	License	MKV	MP4	QTFF	ASF	AVI	MXF	PS, TS	3GP	3G2
AAC	Lossy	1997-12	Royalties on codecs (Note: License required from manufacturers or developers of codecs, but no license fees for the distribution of content.)	Yes	Yes	Yes	AAC-LC, HE-AAC	AAC-LC, HE-AAC (Note: Setting dwSampleSize to 0 in the stream headers triggers VBR stream seeking allowing VBR audio formats in AVI.)	Yes	Private	AAC-LC, HE-AAC	AAC-LC, HE-AAC v1
MP3	Lossy	1991-12	Expired patents	Yes	Yes	MPEG-1 Audio	Yes	Yes	Yes	Yes	No	No
AC-3	Lossy	1991-02	Expired patents	Yes	Yes	Yes	Yes	Yes	Yes	Private	No	No
E-AC-3	Lossy	2005-02	Patent encumbered	QuickTime (Note: Matroska can support some codecs privately when wrapped in a QuickTime data structure.)	Yes	Yes	Yes	No	No	No	No	No
DTS	Lossy	1993-06	Proprietary	Yes	Yes	No	Yes	Yes	No	Private	No	No
WMA	Lossy	1999-08	Proprietary	ACM	No	No	Yes	Yes	No	No	No	No
Opus	Lossy	2012-09	Royalty-free	Yes	Yes	Yes	Yes	Yes	No	Yes	No	No
Vorbis	Lossy	2000-05	Open source	Yes	Private	No	No	Tricky (Note: Vorbis is not officially supported in AVI. While it can technically be muxed into AVI using FFmpeg, Nandub and AVI-Mux GUI many sources report trouble playing back the resulting files, which are incompatible with existing Vorbis decoders for DirectShow and ACM, occasionally causing desynchronization when seeking.)	No	No	No	No
MP2	Lossy	1991-12	Patent-free (Note: Proprietary tools.)	Yes	Yes	No	Yes	Yes	Yes	Yes	No	No
MP1	Lossy	1991-12	Expired patents	Yes	Yes	No	Yes	Yes	Yes	Yes	No	No
QDesign Music 1 and 2	Lossy	1998	Proprietary	QuickTime	No	Yes	No	No	No	No	No	No
ATRAC3	Lossy	2000-09	Proprietary	Yes	No	No	No	No	No	No	No	No
FLAC	Lossless	2001-07	Open source	Yes	Yes	No	Yes	Yes	No	No	No	No
ALAC	Lossless	2004-04	Open source	Yes	Yes	Yes	Yes	Yes	No	No	No	No
WMA Lossless	Lossless	2003-01	Proprietary	ACM	No	No	Yes	Yes	No	No	No	No
DTS-HD	Lossless	2011-08	Proprietary	Yes	Yes	Yes	No	No	No	No	No	No
Dolby TrueHD	Lossless	2006-04	Proprietary	Mature (Note: Dolby TrueHD is supported by common tools such as MKVToolNix and VLC.)	Yes	No	No	No	No	No	No	No
MLP	Lossless	1999-03	Proprietary	No	Yes	No	No	No	No	Private	No	No
ALS	Lossless	2006-03	Patent encumbered	No	Yes	No	No	No	No	Yes	No	No
SLS	Lossless	2006-06	Patent encumbered	No	Yes	No	No	No	No	Yes	No	No
LPCM	Not compressed	1979	Patent-free	Yes	Yes	Yes	Yes	Yes	Yes	Private	No	No
A-law PCM	Not compressed	1972-12	Expired patents	ACM	No	Yes	No	Yes	Yes	No	No	No
μ-law PCM	Not compressed	1972-12	Expired patents	ACM	No	Yes	Yes	Yes	No	No	No	No
IEEE floating-point PCM	Not compressed	≥1985	Patent-free (Note: Special case of LPCM.)	Yes	No	Yes	Yes	Yes	No	No	No	No
Microsoft ADPCM	Not compressed	1992-05	Proprietary	ACM	No	Yes	Yes	Yes	No	No	No	No
DV Audio	Not compressed	1995	Proprietary	No	Yes	Yes	No	No	Yes	No	No	No
AMR	Speech	1999-06	Patent encumbered	No	Yes	No	Yes	Yes	No	No	Yes	AMR-NB, AMR-WB
G.728	Speech	1992-09	Expired patents	No	No	No	No	Yes	No	No	No	No
Speex	Speech	2003-03	Open source	ACM	No	No	No	No	No	No	No	No
QCELP	Speech	1994	Proprietary	No	No	Yes	Yes	No	No	No	No	13K
Other	Other	—	Varies	Musepack, WavPack, TTA, any format supported by ACM	—	IMA 4:1, non-IEEE floating-point PCM, integer PCM	Microsoft GSM 6.10	G.721, G.722, G.723, G.726, G.729a, CVSD, ATRAC1, Dolby AC-2	—	—	EVS	EVRC, EVRC-B, EVRC-WB, SMV, VMR-WB
Obsolete	Other	—	Varies	—	—	MACE 3:1, MACE 6:1	—	Truespeech, many others	—	—	—	—

Support level legend: Full Indirect, lossless Partial Depends on setup None

Some containers only support a restricted set of audio formats:

- DMF only supports MP3, AC-3, DTS and LPCM.
- EVO only supports MP3, AC-3, E-AC-3, DTS, MP2, MP1, DTS-HD, Dolby TrueHD, MLP and LPCM.
- F4V only supports AAC (Note: Adobe Flash Video File Format Specification, pp. 7-8, sec. 1.8.) and MP3.
- FLV only supports AAC, MP3, LPCM, A-law PCM, μ-law PCM, Speex, Asao and SWF ADPCM. (Note: Adobe Flash Video File Format Specification, p. 70, sec. E.4.3.2; p. 1. SWF File Format Specification, Chapter 11: Sounds, pp. 177-192. SWF File Format Specification Version 10, ADPCM Compression.)
- M2TS only supports AC-3, E-AC-3, DTS, DTS-HD, Dolby TrueHD and LPCM.
- Ogg only supports Opus, Vorbis, FLAC, A-law PCM, μ-law PCM, IEEE floating-point PCM, Speex and CELT. OGMtools supports MP3 and AC-3 in Ogg.
- RMVB only supports AC-3, ATRAC3, G.728, AAC-LC, HE-AAC v1, IS-54, Cook Codec, Sipro Lab, ACELP-NET and RealAudio Lossless.
- VOB only supports MP2 directly. It also supports AC-3, DTS, MLP and LPCM as private streams.
- WebM only supports Opus and Vorbis.

Audio-only content can sometimes be placed in a simpler audio-only container, such as Native FLAC for FLAC and ADTS for AAC.

== Subtitle formats support ==
Video container support for subtitle formats
Format	Type	Initial release	License	MKV	MP4	QTFF	ASF	AVI (Note: AVI is not designed to embed subtitles, requiring changes to the format and third party tools such as DirectVobSub and VLC.)	MXF (Note: SMPTE standardized the format for text subtitles in MXF without a reference software implementation, leaving it to independent developers.)	PS, TS	3GP, 3G2
SubRip (Note: SubRip can be converted losslessly to and from native subtitle formats of several containers, and this conversion is supported by many common tools.)	Formatted text	2000-03	Open source	Yes	As TTXT	As TTXT	As SAMI (Note: Requires tools that are not officially related to the container format.)	Needs alterations	As SMPTE-TT	No	As TTXT
WebVTT	Formatted text	2010-08	Open source	Yes	Yes	As TTXT	No	No	As SMPTE-TT	No	As TTXT
ASS, SSA	Formatted text	1996	Open source	Yes	No	No	No	Needs alterations	As SMPTE-TT	No	No
TTXT (Note: TTXT is often called MPEG-4 Timed Text (MP4TT, MP4-TT) or 3GPP Timed Text (3GPP-TT, tx3g).)	XML	2006-04	Patent encumbered	No (Note: MPEG-4 Timed Text subtitles aren't supported in Matroska according to developer of MKVToolNix.)	Yes	Yes	No	No	No	No	Yes
USF	XML	2002-11	Proprietary	Planned	No	No	No	Needs alterations	No	No	No
SAMI	HTML	1998-06	Proprietary	No	No	No	Yes	Needs alterations	As SMPTE-TT	No	No
VobSub	Picture	2001	Patent encumbered	Mature (Note: VobSub, PGS, DVB-SUB and Ogg Kate are well supported by common tools such as MKVToolNix and VLC. The storage format is specified, but the specification is not officially approved yet.)	Yes	Not standard	No	Needs alterations	No	No	No
PGS (Note: HDMV PGS and TextST subtitles are used on HD DVD and Blu-ray.)	Picture	2006-03	Patent encumbered	Mature	As VobSub (Note: Requires tools that are not officially related to the container format.)	No	No	No	No	No	No
DVB-SUB	Picture	1997-09	Patent encumbered	Mature	No	No	No	No	Yes	Yes	No
Ogg Kate	Picture or formatted text	2008-03	Open source	Mature	No	No	No	No	No	No	No
TextST	Text stream	2006-03	Patent encumbered	Beta	No	No	No	No	No	No	No
MicroDVD	Plain text	2000-03	Proprietary	No	No	No	No	Needs alterations	No	No	No
Other	Other	—	Varies	Generic bitmap images, generic plain text	BIFS	Quicktime SMIL, EIA-608, CTA-708	—	XSUB (Note: Needs alterations to the container.)	SMPTE-TT, EBU-TT	CTA-708	—

Support level legend: Full Indirect, lossless Partial, lossy Depends on setup None

Some containers only support a restricted set of subtitle formats:

- DMF only supports XSUB.
- EVO only supports HD DVD PGS.
- F4V only supports TTXT. SubRip and WebVTT can be converted losslessly to TTXT.
- FLV only supports loading subtitles with ActionScript, but this functionality may be restricted to the official Adobe Flash Player. WebVTT can be converted losslessly to ActionScript.
- M2TS only supports Blu-ray PGS. VobSub can be partially converted to PGS using tools that are not officially related to the container format.
- Ogg only supports Ogg Kate and CMML. SubRip can be converted losslessly to Ogg Kate. Ogg Writ is well supported in Ogg in common tools such as OGMtools and VLC, but there's no intention to turn its draft into a fully supported specification. Xiph recommends using Kate for subtitles. MicroDVD can be converted to Ogg Writ.
- RMVB only supports RealText. SMIL can be partially converted to RealText.
- VOB only supports VobSub. PGS can be partially converted to VobSub using tools that are not officially related to the container format.
- WebM only supports WebVTT. SubRip can be converted losslessly to WebVTT.

Converting image subtitles to text formats is possible using third-party tools but relies on optical character recognition, which is not perfectly accurate and can at best extract basic formatting. Conversion of text to images is possible while preserving content and style. Round-trip format conversion between text formats may not be possible without losing some formatting features.

== Overhead ==
Multimedia containers interleave data in media streams to enable efficient playback using fewer computational resources, such as time spent reading from the storage drive, memory needed to buffer selected media streams, and time spent decoding when seeking to a different position in time. In this sense, muxing overhead is the control information added by the container to carry interleaved streams. A smaller overhead results in a smaller file when carrying the same streams with the same data. Overhead is affected by the total number of packets and by the size of stream packet headers. In high bitrate encodings, the content payload is usually large enough to make the overhead data relatively insignificant, but in low bitrate encodings, the inefficiency of the overhead can significantly affect the resulting file size if the container uses large stream packet headers or a large number of packets.

In general, Matroska requires the least overhead, followed by MP4, AVI and Ogg.

== See also ==
- List of codecs
- List of open-source codecs
- Enhanced podcast
