= Enhanced VOB =

Container format for HD DVD video media

- Filename extension: .evo
- Developed by: DVD Forum
- Initial release: 31 June 2006; 19 years ago
- Type of format: Container format
- Container for: Audio, video, subtitles
- Contained by: HD DVD
- Extended from: MPEG transport stream (ISO/IEC 13818-1)
- Standard: DVD Book
- Open format?: No
- Free format?: No

Enhanced Video Object, also known as Enhanced VOB, EVOB or EVO, is a container format for HD DVD video media. It contains the actual digital video, digital audio, subtitle and DVD menu contents in stream form. It is an extension to VOB. It can contain video encoded in H.264/MPEG-4 AVC, VC-1, or H.262/MPEG-2 Part 2 and audio encoded in AC-3, E-AC-3, Dolby TrueHD, DTS, DTS-HD, PCM, and MPEG-2 Part 3.

Some software that can play EVO files include PowerDVD, WinDVD for Windows, FFmpeg for Linux (unprotected EVO only), and the cross platform VLC Player.
