= Motion JPEG 2000 =

File format

- Filename extension: .mj2, .mjp2
- Internet media type: video/mj2
- Magic number: 12 byte string: X'0000 000C 6A50 2020 0D0A 870A'
- Developed by: Joint Photographic Experts Group
- Initial release: December 2003; 22 years ago
- Latest release: ISO/IEC 15444-3:2007/AMD 1:2010; October 2010; 15 years ago
- Type of format: Video coding format
- Container for: video, sound
- Extended from: ISO base media file format
- Extended to: Motion JPEG 2000 Simple Profile, Motion JPEG 2000 Motion Picture Archive Preservation Format Profile, Motion JPEG 2000 Motion Picture Archive Access Format Profile
- Standard: ISO/IEC 15444-3, ITU-T T.802
- Open format?: Yes
- Free format?: No
- Website: http://www.jpeg.org/jpeg2000/j2kpart3.html

Motion JPEG 2000 (MJ2 or MJP2) is a file format for motion sequences of JPEG 2000 images and associated audio, based on the MP4 and QuickTime format. Filename extensions for Motion JPEG 2000 video files are .mj2 and .mjp2, as defined in RFC 3745.

== ISO Standards ==
MJ2, first defined by Part 3 of the ISO Standard for JPEG 2000 ISO/IEC 15444 in November 2001 (ISO/IEC 15444-3:2002) as a standalone document, has later been defined by ISO/IEC 15444-3:2007, ISO/IEC 15444-3:2007/Amd 1:2010, additional profiles for archiving applications, and by ISO/IEC 15444-12 which defines the JPEG 2000 base media format, which contains the timing, structure, and media information for timed sequences of media data.

The standard is available for download from ITU-T as their Recommendation T.802.

== MPEG vs MJ2 ==
Motion JPEG2000 was always intended to coexist with MPEG. Unlike MPEG, MJ2 does not implement inter-frame coding; each frame is coded independently using JPEG 2000. This makes MJ2 more resilient to propagation of errors over time, more scalable, and better suited to networked and point-to-point environments, with additional advantages over MPEG with respect to random frame access, but at the expense of increased storage and bandwidth requirements.

== History ==
From 1997 to 2000, the JPEG 2000 image compression standard was developed by a Joint Photographic Experts Group (JPEG) committee chaired by Swiss-Iranian engineer Touradj Ebrahimi (later the JPEG president). In contrast to the original 1992 JPEG standard, which is a discrete cosine transform (DCT) based lossy compression format for static digital images, JPEG 2000 is a discrete wavelet transform (DWT) based compression standard that could be adapted for motion imaging video compression with the Motion JPEG 2000 extension. JPEG 2000 technology was later selected as the video coding standard for digital cinema in 2004.

== See also ==
- Motion JPEG
