= RMVB =

RealMedia Variable Bitrate
- Filename extension: .rmvb
- Internet media type: application/vnd.rn-realmedia-vbr
- Magic number: 0x2E524D46 (".RMF")
- Developed by: RealNetworks
- Initial release: 2003; 22 years ago
- Type of format: Container format
- Open format?: No
- Free format?: No

RealMedia Variable Bitrate (RMVB) is a variable bitrate extension of the RealMedia multimedia digital container format developed by RealNetworks. As opposed to the more common RealMedia container, which holds streaming media encoded at a constant bitrate (CBR), RMVB is typically used for multimedia content stored locally. Files using this format have the file extension ".rmvb".

== Details ==
RealMedia uses compression similar to MPEG-4 Part 10 encoders such as x264.

RMVB files are popular for distributing Asian content, especially Chinese television episodes and movies. For this reason, they have become noticeably present (though not entirely popular, partly due to their incompatibility with other media players) on file sharing platforms such as BitTorrent, eDonkey and Gnutella.

On the Windows platform, the proprietary RealPlayer SP (RealPlayer 10 and later) and the open-sourced Media Player Classic support RMVB, using an appropriate DirectShow filter or Real Alternative. On Linux and other Unix-like platforms, MPlayer, xine, and Totem are able to play RMVB files using the open-source, reverse-engineered RMVB implementation in FFmpeg. The format is also supported for playback by the cross-platform VLC media player.

The file header for the format consists of the four bytes ".RMF" (hex 2E 52 4D 46), the same as the standard RealMedia format.

== See also ==
- RealMedia
- RealVideo codecs
- RealAudio codecs
- Digital container format
- Comparison of container formats
- Comparison of video player software
