= MPEG-2 transport stream =

MPEG-2 transport stream may refer to:

- MPEG transport stream, defined in the ISO MPEG-2 standard
- .m2ts, a filename extension used for the BDAV MPEG-2 Transport Stream, defined by Blu-ray Disc Association
