= ETRM =

ETRM may refer to:

- Energy Trading and Risk Management (tool), a software tool to trade and analyze energy assets.
- Enterprise Technical Reference Model, an Open format
