= GXF =

GXF may refer to:

- Gaby's Xtraordinary Files, a Philippine educational television series
- General Exchange Format
- Gila Bend Air Force Auxiliary Field, in Arizona, United States
- Global X Funds, an American investment company
- Sayun Airport, in Yemen
