= General Exchange Format =

File exchange format

- Filename extension: .gxf
- Internet media type: application/gxf
- Type code: "gxf "
- Initial release: 2001
- Type of format: Container format
- Container for: audiovisual material

General eXchange Format (GXF) is a file exchange format for the transfer of simple and compound clips between television program storage systems. It is a container format that can contain Motion JPEG (M-JPEG), MPEG, or DV-based video compression standards, with associated audio, time code, and user data that may include user-defined metadata.

GXF was developed by Grass Valley Group, then standardized by SMPTE as SMPTE 360M, and was extended in SMPTE RDD 14-2007 to include high-definition video resolutions.

GXF has a fairly simple data model compared with SMPTE MXF container format since it should be used for file transfers and not as a storage format with no editing capabilities. SMPTE RDD 14-2007 is only 57 pages long, compared with many hundreds of pages for the MXF standards.

== Applications and tools ==
=== Applications ===
- The FFmpeg multimedia converter and VLC media player free video player support GXF;
- theScribe LITE is a GXF player that also supports MXF.

=== Parser and checker ===
- Grassvalley offers a win32-based tool "tstream", for parsing GXF files and checking to ensure the contents conform to spec.

=== Tools ===
- GXF::SDK is a C++ [SDK] that implements the GXF standard to ease the reading, creation, sub-clipping, merge and rewrap of GXF files. It supports: MPEG video, DV, PCM, AC3 and Dolby E audio, Timecode, AFD, VBI and ANC;
- GXFDShowFilter is a DirectShow filter that enables Windows MediaPlayer and other DirectShow-based applications to play back GXF files.
