= M4V =

File format

- Filename extension: .m4v
- Internet media type: video/x-m4v
- Developed by: Apple Inc.
- Container for: Audio, video (H.264, AAC, and Dolby Digital)
- Extended from: iTunes video format

The M4V file format is a video container format developed by Apple and is very similar to the MP4 format. The primary difference is that M4V files may optionally be protected by DRM copy protection. Besides, the extension signals to operating systems like Microsoft Windows that the video clip is a licensed movie, and not a normal MPEG video. It additionally ensures that embedded covers are correctly displayed in the Windows file explorer.

Its first public appearance was in 2006, when Apple introduced the iTunes Store. The M4V format has been an important part of the Apple ecosystem ever since, and is often used to distribute movies, series, and other video content on the iTunes Store. Unauthorized reproduction of M4V files may be prevented using Apple's FairPlay copy protection. A FairPlay-protected M4V file can only be played on a computer authorized (using iTunes) with the account that was used to purchase the video. In QuickTime, M4V videos using FairPlay DRM are identified as "AVC0 Media".

Besides Apple iTunes and the Apple QuickTime Player, M4V files can also be opened and played with Media Player Classic, K-Multimedia Player, RealPlayer, Zoom Player, VLC media player, MPlayer, DivX Plus Player, and Nero Showtime (included with Nero Multimedia Suite). Final Cut Pro and iMovie can also export to this format. The format without DRM can also be played in the webOS Video Player for use on the Palm Pre, Palm Pixi smartphones. It is also playable by the Android operating system with its video player. It is used as the default video conversion format for HandBrake and Air Video Server on the Macintosh because of its backward compatibility with QuickTime version 7. Some other video players can also recognize and play M4V files if the file extension is changed from ".m4v" to ".mp4".

HandBrake-produced M4V files can also be played on the PlayStation 3, with full Dolby Digital 5.1 surround support.

== See also ==
- Comparison of (audio/video) container formats
- List of multimedia (audio/video) codecs
  - List of open-source codecs
  - Comparison of video codecs
  - Comparison of audio coding formats
