= Extensible Binary Meta Language =

- Magic number: 1a 45 df a3
- Extended to: Matroska
- Standard: RFC 8794

Extensible Binary Meta Language (EBML) is a generalized file format for any kind of data, aiming to be a binary equivalent to XML. It provides a basic framework for storing data in XML-like tags. It was originally designed as the framework language for the Matroska audio/video container format.

EBML is not extensible in the same way that XML is, as the XML schema (e.g., DTD) must be known in advance.

== See also ==
- Binary XML
- WBXML
- Matroska
- WebM
- XML
- IFF, an older structured binary format widely adopted for multimedia
