= Variable frame rate =

Variable frame rate (or VFR) is a term in video compression for a feature supported by some container formats which allows for the frame rate to change actively during video playback, or to drop the idea of frame rate completely and set an individual timecode for each frame. Many smartphone cameras record their videos in VFR, sometimes causing audio-video sync difficulties when editing phone videos in video editors. VFR is even more useful for creating videos of slideshow presentations or when the video contains large amounts of completely static frames, as a means of improving compression rate, or if the video contains a combination of 24/25/30/50/60 FPS footages and the creator or editor of the video wishes to avoid artifacts arising from framerate-conversion.

In video recording, a lowered framerate may be preferred in darker environments to extend the exposure time per frame, allowing the image sensor to capture more light, which results in brighter footage.

== See also ==
- Comparison of container formats
