= MPEG-4 Part 17 =

MPEG-4 Part 17, or MPEG-4 Timed Text (MP4TT), or MPEG-4 Streaming text format is the text-based subtitle format for MPEG-4, published as ISO/IEC 14496-17 in 2006. It was developed in response to the need for a generic method for coding of text as one of the multimedia components within audiovisual presentations.

It is also streamable, which was one of the main aspects when creating the format. It is mainly aimed for use in the .mp4 container, but can also be used in the .3gp container as 3GPP Timed Text (TTXT), which is technically almost identical with .mp4 but more used in cell phones. 3GPP Timed Text is exactly the same as MPEG-4 Timed Text when used in the .mp4 container. It can be also used in other file formats based on the ISO base media file format.

3GPP approved the Timed text format for 3G multimedia services in 3GPP TS 26.245 in 2004. MPEG-4 Part 17 (ISO/IEC 14496-17:2006) defined Text Streams that are capable of carrying 3GPP Timed Text. For 3GPP text streams, ISO/IEC 14496-17:2006 defined a generic framing structure suitable for transport of 3GPP text streams across a variety of networks (RTP and MPEG transport stream and MPEG program stream). The framing structure for text streams consists of so-called Timed Text Units (TTU).

== Supporting implementations ==
QuickTime Pro and MP4Box can create or produce these subtitle streams out of various subtitle input formats. MP4Box uses the FourCC tx3g for MPEG-4 Timed Text because of its inherently higher compatibility. MPEG-4 Timed Text is heavily based on XML semantics.

On October 7, 2005, VideoLAN added decoding support for MPEG-4 Timed Text subtitles in VLC.

On October 30, 2005, Gabest added decoding support for MPEG-4 Timed Text subtitles in MPC.

== See also ==
- Ogg Writ
- SubRip
- WebVTT
