= MPEG-2 Part 3 =

Part 3 of the MPEG-2 standard (formally known as ISO/IEC 13818-3, also known as MPEG-2 Audio or MPEG-2 BC) defines audio coding:

- MPEG Multichannel - It enhances MPEG-1's audio by allowing the coding of audio programs with more than two channels, up to 5.1 multichannel. This method is backwards-compatible (also known as MPEG-2 BC), allowing MPEG-1 audio decoders to decode the two main stereo components of the presentation.
- MPEG-2 Part 3 also defined additional bit rates and sample rates for MPEG-1 Audio Layer I, MPEG-1 Audio Layer II and MPEG-1 Audio Layer III (the first version of MP3).

The MPEG-2 Part 3 should not be confused with MPEG-2 Part 7: AAC a.k.a. MPEG-2 NBC (Non-Backward Compatible) - the MPEG-2 Advanced Audio Coding with support for multichannel encoding (up to 48 channels).

== Overview ==
MPEG-2 Part 3 introduced new audio encoding methods compared to MPEG-1 Part 3: MPEG-2 BC (backward compatible with MPEG-1 audio formats)

- low bitrate encoding with halved sampling rate (MPEG-1 Layer 1/2/3 LSF - "Low Sampling Frequencies")
- multichannel encoding with up to 5.1 channels
