= Meridian Lossless Packing =

Audio file format

The Meridian Lossless Packing logo

The Advanced Resolution logo

Meridian Lossless Packing, also known as Packed PCM (PPCM), is a lossless compression technique for PCM audio data developed by Meridian Audio, Ltd. MLP is the standard lossless compression method for DVD-Audio content (often advertised with the Advanced Resolution logo) and typically provides about 1.5:1 compression on most music material. All DVD-Audio players are equipped with MLP decoding, while its use on the discs themselves is at their producers' discretion.

Dolby TrueHD, used in Archival Disc, Blu-ray, and HD DVD, employs the MLP codec, but compared with DVD-Audio, adds higher bit rates, 32 full-range channels, extensive metadata, and custom speaker placements (as specified by SMPTE).

Standard DVD has a maximum transfer rate of 9.6 Mbit/s, around 70 percent of the bit rate needed to store 6 uncompressed audio channels of 24-bit/96 kHz. Should MLP not be able to compress the stream below the maximum transfer rate – or in case there is a need to reduce the size to fit overall disc capacity – it can exploit (lossy) pre-quantization zeroing out least significant bits when necessary. The MLP stream can also contain "substreams", like surround and stereo downmix, which need not be of the same bit depth or sampling frequency – this further enables (lossy) pre-processing to save space. TrueHD streams cannot do this (likely because Blu-ray discs have higher storage capacity).

MLP is streamable: A decoder can pick up the stream and start decoding from that point on nearly instantly, where the encoder has inserted a "restart block" in the stream. Typically, restart information is inserted approximately every 5 ms in the audio, about the same as a typical 96 kHz FLAC stream.

== MLP in packaged media formats ==
Media format	Status	Channels	Maximum bit rate
HD DVD	Mandatory	2 to 8	18 Mbit/s
Blu-ray	Optional	2 to 8	18 Mbit/s
DVD-Audio	Mandatory	1 to 6	9.6 Mbit/s
DVD-Video	—N/a		

== See also ==
- Direct Stream Transfer
- Dolby TrueHD
- DTS-HD Master Audio
- FLAC
- Master Quality Authenticated
- Monkey's Audio
- WavPack
