= AMV video format =

Digital video format

AMV
- Filename extension: .amv, .mtv
- Internet media type: video/x-amv
- Container for: Audio, video
- Extended from: AVI and Motion JPEG
- Standard: proprietary

AMV (Actions Media Video) is a proprietary video file format designed for portable media players (often marketed as "MP4 players"), as well as S1 MP3 players with video playback. There are two different versions of this format: an older one for Actions chips, and a newer one for ALi's M5661 chip, sometimes called ALIAVI.

== Format ==
The container is a modified version of AVI. The video format is a variant of Motion JPEG, with fixed rather than variable quantisation tables. The audio format is a variant of IMA ADPCM, where the first 8 bytes of each frame are origin (16 bits), index (16 bits) and number of encoded 16-bit samples (32 bits); all known AMV files run sound at 22050 samples/second.

Low decoder overhead is paramount as the S1 MP3 players have very low-end processors (a Z80 variant). Video compression ratio is low – around 4 pixels/byte, compared with over 10 pixels/byte for MPEG-2 – though as the files are of low resolution (96×96 up to 208×176) and frame rate (10, 12, or 16 frame/s), file sizes are small in bytes per second. With a resolution of 128×96 pixels and a framerate of 12 frame/s, a 30-minute video will be compressed into 80 MB.

== Documentation ==
Documentation for this format is not publicly available, but Dobrica Pavlinušić reverse engineered the format to produce a Perl-based decoder. Pavlinušić, along with Tom Van Braeckel and Vladimir Voroshilov, produced a version of FFmpeg that works on AMV files.

== Uses ==
Fake or cloned iPod Nano (4th generation) devices are reported to only support AMV video formats for video playback. These cloned devices are sold with an AMV video converter software in a CD. These AMV video converter software are also available as freeware such as the MPxConverter by Bytessence.
