= MKVToolNix =

Free and open source Matroska libraries and toolset

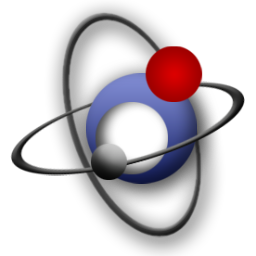

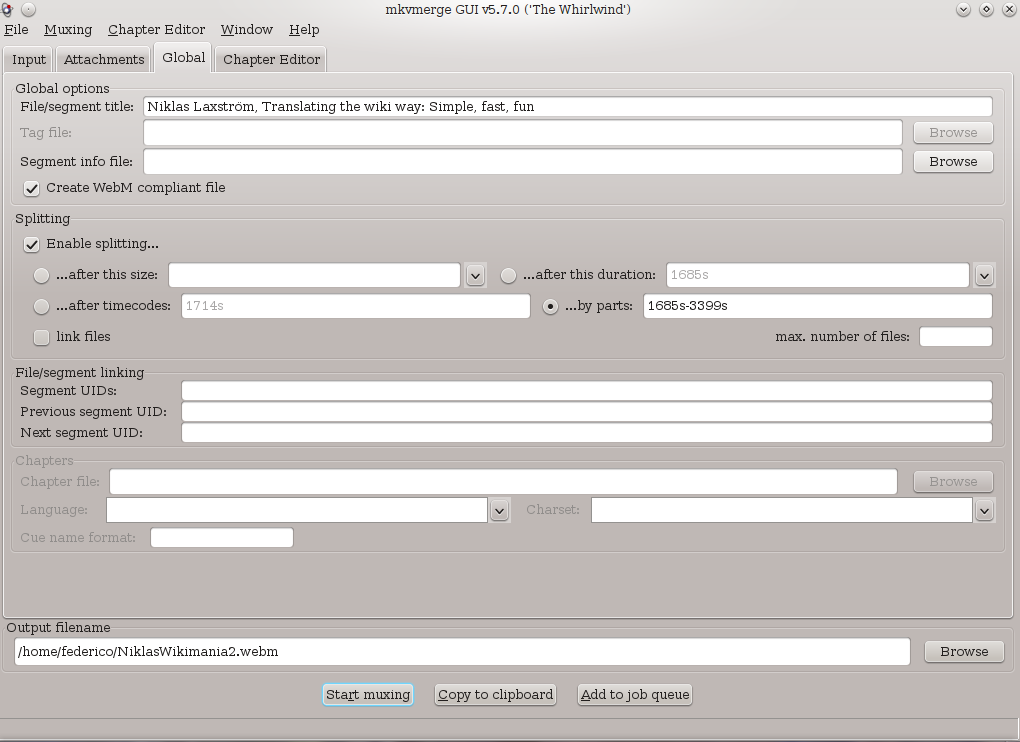
- mkvmerge GUI v5.7.0, a component of MKVToolNix, showing its "Global" tab
- Original author: Moritz Bunkus
- Developer: Moritz Bunkus
- Release: April 30, 2003; 23 years ago
- Stable release: 103.0 / October 18, 2026; 1 day ago
- Written in: C++ (GUI: originally in wxWidgets, but ported to Qt5 due to the wxWidgets problems.
- Operating system: Unix-like, macOS, Microsoft Windows, Linux
- Size: ~20 MB
- Available in: 27 languages: list
- Type: Multimedia software (container format manipulation)
- License: GPLv2 only
- Website: mkvtoolnix.download
- Repository: codeberg.org/mbunkus/mkvtoolnix

MKVToolNix is a collection of tools for the Matroska media container format by Moritz Bunkus including mkvmerge. The free and open source Matroska libraries and tools are available for various platforms including Linux and BSD distributions, macOS and Microsoft Windows. The tools can be also downloaded from video software distributors and FOSS repositories.

== Applications ==
MKVToolNix was reviewed by the Linux Journal, Linux Format, the ICTE Journal, and Softpedia among others. The tools are cited in patents for a "Universal container for audio data". A "portable" Windows edition exists, but is not yet available in the PortableApps format.

== Components ==
MKVToolNix GUI
is a GUI for mkvmerge built in Qt, and a successor of mmg.
mkvmerge
merges multimedia streams into a Matroska file.
mkvinfo
lists all elements contained in a Matroska file.
mkvextract
extracts specific parts from a Matroska file to other formats.
mkvpropedit
allows to analyze and modify some Matroska file properties.

== See also ==
- Converting video on Wikimedia Commons
- List of open-source codecs
