= MPEG program stream =

Container format for multiplexing digital audio, video and more

MPEG Program Stream
- Filename extension: .mpg, .mpeg, .m2p, .ps
- Internet media type: video/MP2P, video/MP1S, video/mpeg
- Uniform Type Identifier (UTI): public.mpeg
- Developed by: MPEG
- Initial release: August 1993; 33 years ago
- Latest release: ISO/IEC 13818-1:2019; June 2019; 7 years ago
- Type of format: Container format
- Container for: Audio, video, data
- Extended to: VOB, EVO, MOD
- Standard: ISO/IEC 11172-1, ISO/IEC 13818-1, ITU-T H.222.0
- Open format?: Yes
- Free format?: Yes

Program stream (PS or MPEG-PS) is a container format for multiplexing digital audio, video and more. The PS format is specified in MPEG-1 Part 1 (ISO/IEC 11172-1) and MPEG-2 Part 1, Systems (ISO/IEC standard 13818-1/ITU-T H.222.0). The MPEG-2 Program Stream is analogous and similar to ISO/IEC 11172 Systems layer and it is forward compatible.

Program streams are used on DVD-Video discs and HD DVD video discs, but with some restrictions and extensions. The filename extensions are VOB and EVO respectively.

== Coding structure ==
Program streams are created by combining one or more packetized elementary streams (PES), which have a common time base, into a single stream. It is designed for reasonably reliable media such as disks, in contrast to MPEG transport stream which is for data transmission in which loss of data is likely. Program streams have variable size records and minimal use of start codes which would make over the air reception difficult, but has less overhead. Program stream coding layer allows only one program of one or more elementary streams to be packaged into a single stream, in contrast to transport stream, which allows multiple programs.

MPEG-2 Program stream can contain MPEG-1 Part 2 video, MPEG-2 Part 2 video, MPEG-1 Part 3 audio (MP3, MP2, MP1) or MPEG-2 Part 3 audio. It can also contain MPEG-4 Part 2 video, MPEG-2 Part 7 audio (AAC) or MPEG-4 Part 3 (AAC) audio, but they are rarely used. The MPEG-2 Program stream has provisions for non-standard data (e.g. AC-3 audio or subtitles) in the form of so-called private streams. International Organization for Standardization authorized SMPTE Registration Authority, LLC as the registration authority for MPEG-2 format identifiers. It publishes a list of compression formats which can be encapsulated in MPEG-2 transport stream and program stream.

== Coding details ==
Partial MPEG-2 Program Stream pack header format
Name	Number of bits	Description
sync bytes	32	0x000001BA
marker bits	2	01b for MPEG-2 version. The marker bits for the MPEG-1 version are 4 bits with value 0010b.
System clock [32..30]	3	System Clock Reference (SCR) bits 32 to 30
marker bit	1	1 Bit always set.
System clock [29..15]	15	System clock bits 29 to 15
marker bit	1	1 Bit always set.
System clock [14..0]	15	System clock bits 14 to 0
marker bit	1	1 Bit always set.
SCR extension	9	
marker bit	1	1 Bit always set.
bit rate	22	In units of 50 bytes per second.
marker bits	2	11 Bits always set.
reserved	5	reserved for future use
stuffing length	3	
stuffing bytes	8*stuffing length	
system header (optional)	0 or more	if system header start code follows: 0x000001BB

Partial system header format
Name	Number of bytes	Description
sync bytes	4	0x000001BB
header length	2	
rate bound and marker bits	3	
audio bound and flags	1	
flags, marker bit, and video bound	1	
Packet rate restriction and reserved byte	1	

== See also ==
- Elementary stream
- MPEG transport stream
