= QuickTime File Format =

Multimedia container file format

QuickTime Movie
- Filename extension: .mov, .movie, .qt
- Internet media type: video/quicktime
- Type code: MooV
- Uniform Type Identifier (UTI): com.apple.quicktime-movie
- Developed by: Apple Inc.
- Initial release: Proprietary: December 2, 1991; 34 years ago Public: March 1, 2001; 25 years ago
- Latest release: September 13, 2016; 9 years ago
- Type of format: Container format
- Container for: Audio, video, text
- Extended to: MPEG-4 Part 12
- Open format?: Yes
- Free format?: No

QuickTime File Format (QTFF) is a computer file format used natively by the QuickTime framework.

== Design ==
The format specifies a multimedia container file that contains one or more tracks, each of which stores a particular type of data: audio, video, or text (e.g. for subtitles). Each track either contains a digitally-encoded media stream (using a specific format) or a data reference to the media stream located in another file. Tracks are maintained in a hierarchical data structure consisting of objects called atoms. An atom can be a parent to other atoms or it can contain media or edit data, but it is not supposed to do both.

The ability to contain abstract data references for the media data, and the separation of the media data from the media offsets and the track edit lists means that QuickTime is particularly suited for editing, as it is capable of importing and editing in place (without data copying). Other later-developed media container formats such as Microsoft's Advanced Systems Format or the Matroska and Ogg containers lack this abstraction, and require all media data to be rewritten after editing.

== Relation to MP4 ==
Because both the QuickTime and MP4 container formats can use the same MPEG-4 formats, they are mostly interchangeable in a QuickTime-only environment. MP4, being an international standard, has more support. This is especially true on hardware devices, such as the PlayStation Portable and various DVD players; on the software side, most DirectShow and Video for Windows codec packs include an MP4 parser, but not one for QTFF.

In QuickTime Pro's MPEG-4 Export dialog, an option called "Passthrough" allows a clean export to MP4 without affecting the audio or video streams. One discrepancy ushered in by QuickTime 7 released on April 29, 2005, is that the QuickTime file format supports multichannel audio (used, for example, in the high-definition trailers on Apple's site).

== Extensions ==
The International Organization for Standardization approved the QuickTime file format as the basis of the MPEG-4 file format. The MPEG-4 file format specification was created on the basis of the QuickTime format specification published in 2001. The MP4 (.mp4) file format was published in 2001 as the revision of the MPEG-4 Part 1: Systems specification published in 1999 (ISO/IEC 14496-1:2001). In 2003, the first version of MP4 format was revised and replaced by MPEG-4 Part 14: MP4 file format (ISO/IEC 14496-14:2003). The MP4 file format was generalized into the ISO Base Media File Format ISO/IEC 14496-12:2004, which defines a general structure for time-based media files. It in turn is used as the basis for other multimedia file formats (for example 3GP, Motion JPEG 2000). A list of all registered extensions for ISO Base Media File Format is published on the official registration authority website www.mp4ra.org. This registration authority for code-points in "MP4 Family" files is Apple Inc. and it is named in Annex D (informative) in MPEG-4 Part 12.

== See also ==
- Comparison of video container formats
