= VOB =

Container format in DVD-Video media

- Filename extension: .vob, .ifo, .bup
- Internet media type: video/dvd, video/mpeg, video/x-ms-vob
- Developed by: DVD Forum
- Type of format: Container format
- Container for: Audio, video, subtitles
- Contained by: DVD-Video
- Extended from: MPEG program stream (ISO/IEC 13818-1)
- Standard: DVD-Video Book
- Open format?: No
- Free format?: No

VOB (for video object) is the container format in DVD-Video media. VOB can contain digital video, digital audio, subtitles, DVD menus and navigation contents multiplexed together into a stream form. Files in VOB format may be encrypted.

== File format ==
Files in VOB format have a .vob filename extension and are typically stored in the VIDEO_TS directory at the root of a DVD. The VOB format is based on the MPEG program stream format, but with additional limitations and specifications in the private streams. The MPEG program stream has provisions for non-standard data (as used in VOB files) in the form of so-called private streams. VOB files are a very strict subset of the MPEG program stream standard. While all VOB files are MPEG program streams, not all MPEG program streams comply with the definition for a VOB file.

Analogous to the MPEG program stream, a VOB file can contain H.262/MPEG-2 Part 2 or MPEG-1 Part 2 video, MPEG-1 Audio Layer II or MPEG-2 Audio Layer II audio, but usage of these compression formats in a VOB file has some restrictions in comparison to the MPEG program stream. In addition, a VOB file can contain linear PCM, AC-3 or DTS audio and subpictures. VOB files cannot contain AAC audio (MPEG-2 Part 7), MPEG-4 compression formats and others, which are allowed in the MPEG program stream standard.

On the DVD, all of the content for one title set is contiguous, but if necessary is broken up into 1 GiB VOB files in order to be compatible with all operating systems, as some cannot read files larger than that size.

=== Companion files ===
VOB files may be accompanied with IFO and BUP files. These files respectively have .ifo and .bup filename extensions.

IFO (information) files contain all the information a DVD player needs to know about a DVD so that the user can navigate and play all DVD content properly, such as where a chapter starts, where a certain audio or subtitle stream is located, information about menu functions and navigation. BUP (backup) files are exact redundant copies of IFO files, supplied to help in case of corruption. Video players may not allow DVD navigation when IFO or BUP files are absent.

== Copy protection ==
Almost all commercially produced DVD-Video titles use some restriction or copy protection method, which also affects VOB files. Copy protection is usually used for copyrighted content.

Many DVD-Video titles are encrypted with Content Scramble System (CSS). This is a data encryption and communications authentication method designed to prevent copying video and audio data directly from the DVD-Video discs. Decryption and authentication keys needed for playing back encrypted VOB files are stored in the normally inaccessible lead-in area of the DVD and are used only by CSS decryption software (e.g., in a DVD player or software player). If someone is trying to copy the contents of an encrypted DVD-Video (e.g., VOB files) to a hard drive, an error can occur, because the DVD was not authenticated in the drive by CSS decryption software. Authentication of the disc allows the copying of individual VOB files without error, but the encryption keys will not be copied. If the copied undecrypted VOB files are opened in a player, they will request the keys from the DVD-ROM drive and will fail. There are many CSS-decrypting programs, or ripping software, such as libdvdcss, DeCSS, DVD Decrypter, AnyDVD or DVD Shrink which allow a protected DVD-Video disc to be played without access to the original key or copied to hard disk unscrambled. In some countries, their usage can be a violation of law (e.g. for non-personal use).

== Playback ==
A player of generic MPEG-2 files can usually play unencrypted VOB files, which contain MPEG-1 Audio Layer II audio. Other audio compression formats such as AC-3 or DTS are less widely supported.

KMPlayer, VLC media player, GOM player, Media Player Classic and more platform-specific players like ALLPlayer play VOB files.

== Other DVD containers ==
Some DVD Recorders use DVD-VR format and store multiplexed audiovisual content in VRO containers. A VRO file is equivalent to a collection of DVD-Video VOB files. The VRO files can be played directly like a VOB if no editing is intended. Fragmented VRO files are not widely supported by software players and video editing software.

Enhanced VOB (EVO) is also an extension to VOB, originally meant for the now-discontinued HD DVD video. It can contain additional video and audio formats such H.264 and AAC.

== See also ==
- Comparison of video container formats
- List of video editing software
