= MPEG-1 Audio Layer I =

Audio formats

- Filename extension: .mp1
- Internet media type: audio/mpeg, audio/MPA
- Initial release: December 6, 1991; 34 years ago
- Latest release: ISO/IEC 13818-3:1998; April 1998; 28 years ago
- Type of format: Lossy audio
- Contained by: MPEG-ES
- Standard: ISO/IEC 11172-3, ISO/IEC 13818-3
- Open format?: Yes
- Free format?: Expired patents
- Website: http://mpeg.chiariglione.org/standards/mpeg-1/audio

MP1 (formally MPEG-1 Audio Layer I or MPEG-2 Audio Layer I) is a lossy audio codec and one of three audio formats included in the MPEG-1 standard. For files only containing MP1 audio, the file extension .mp1 is used.

It is a deliberately simplified version of MPEG-1 Audio Layer II, created for applications where lower compression efficiency could be tolerated in return for a less complex algorithm that could be executed with simpler hardware requirements. While supported by most media players, the codec is considered largely obsolete due to wider acceptance of the more complex MPEG-1 Audio Layer II (MP2) and MPEG-1 Audio Layer III (MP3) codecs.

A limited version of MPEG-1 Audio Layer I was used by the Digital Compact Cassette format, in the form of the PASC (Precision Adaptive Subband Coding) audio compression codec. PASC and MPEG-1 Audio Layer I were essentially identical, except:

- The bit rate of PASC was fixed at 384 kilobits per second.
- The only channel configurations supported by PASC were Stereo, Joint Stereo, and Dual Mono (on prerecorded cassettes only). Mono was not supported because of the fixed bit rate.
- PASC regards the padding "slots" that are needed for encoding at 44.1 kHz stereo as "dummy" and sets them to zero, whereas the ISO/IEC 11172-3 standard uses the extra 32 bits in each padded frame to store data.

== Specification ==
MPEG-1 Audio Layer I is defined in ISO/IEC 11172-3, the first version of which was published in 1993.

- Sampling rates: 32, 44.1 and 48 kHz
- Bitrates: 32, 64, 96, 128, 160, 192, 224, 256, 288, 320, 352, 384, 416 and 448 kbit/s

An extension has been provided in MPEG-2 Audio Layer I and is defined in ISO/IEC 13818-3, which first version was published in 1995.

- Additional sampling rates: 16, 22.05 and 24 kHz
- Additional bitrates: 48, 56, 80, 112, 144 and 176 kbit/s

MP1 uses a comparatively simple sub-band coding, using 32 sub-bands.
