= Dolby TrueHD =

Advanced lossless multi-channel audio codec

Dolby TrueHd
- Filename extension: .thd

Dolby TrueHD is a lossless, multi-channel audio codec developed by Dolby Laboratories for home video, used principally in Blu-ray Disc and compatible hardware. Dolby TrueHD, along with Dolby Digital Plus (E-AC-3) and Dolby AC-4, is one of the intended successors to the Dolby Digital (AC-3) lossy surround format. Dolby TrueHD competes with DTS's DTS-HD Master Audio (DTS-HD MA), another lossless surround sound codec. Dolby TrueHD was announced in 2005.

The Dolby TrueHD specification provides for up to 16 discrete audio channels, each with a sampling rate of up to 192 kHz and sample depth of up to 24 bits. Dolby's compression mechanism for TrueHD is Meridian Lossless Packing (MLP); prior to Dolby TrueHD, MLP was used for the DVD-Audio format, although the two formats' respective implementations of MLP are not mutually compatible. A Dolby TrueHD audio stream varies in bitrate, as does any other losslessly compressed audio format.

Like its predecessor, Dolby TrueHD's bitstream carries program metadata, or non-audio information that a decoder uses to modify its interpretation of the audio data. Dolby TrueHD metadata may include, for example, audio normalization or dynamic range compression. In addition, Dolby Atmos, a multi-dimensional surround format encoded using Dolby TrueHD, can embed more advanced metadata to spatially place sound objects in an Atmos-compatible speaker system.

== Blu-ray Disc ==
In the Blu-ray Disc specification, Dolby TrueHD tracks may carry up to 8 discrete audio channels (7.1 surround) of 24-bit audio at 96 kHz, or up to 6 channels (5.1 surround) at 192 kHz. The maximum bitrate of an audio stream including metadata is 18 Mbit/s (instantaneous, since it is variable bitrate), and a TrueHD frame is either 1/1200 seconds long (for 48000, 96000 or 192000 Hz) or 1/1102.5 seconds long (for 44100, 88200 or 176400 Hz). Any Blu-ray player or AV receiver that can decode TrueHD can also downmix a multi-channel TrueHD track into any smaller amount of channels for final playback (for example, a 7.1 track to a 5.1 output, or a 5.1 track to a stereo output) by merging discrete channels' signals (except the low-frequency effects channel, the ".1," in a stereo mixdown, which is discarded due to its sound not playing back well without a dedicated subwoofer).

Dolby TrueHD is an optional codec, which means that Blu-ray hardware may decode it, but also may not (for example, inexpensive or early players, Blu-ray computer software, or pre–Blu-ray AV receivers). Consequently, all Blu-rays that include Dolby TrueHD audio also include a fail-safe track of Dolby Digital (AC-3), a mandatory codec. Unlike the competing DTS-HD Master Audio, which encodes its primary (optional) track in terms of differences from the companion mandatory track, a Dolby TrueHD-equipped Blu-ray's primary and companion tracks are redundant; the Dolby TrueHD bitstream has no data in common with the AC-3 bitstream. Similar to DTS-HD MA, however, Dolby TrueHD's dual tracks are opaque to the user; a Blu-ray player loaded with a Dolby TrueHD disc will automatically fall back to AC-3 if it cannot decode or pass through the lossless bitstream, with no explicit selection required (or offered).

Dolby TrueHD's prominence relative to DTS-HD MA began to decline around 2010. It has experienced a mild resurgence as the encoding used for Dolby Atmos audio (especially in Ultra HD Blu-ray titles), but DTS-HD MA is still more common on titles with non-Atmos lossless audio. Regardless, publishers such as Paramount Home Entertainment and Crunchyroll still use Dolby TrueHD for their non-Atmos releases. Universal Pictures Home Entertainment has recently used Dolby TrueHD on occasion.

== Transport ==
Audio encoded using Dolby TrueHD may be transported to A/V receivers in one of three ways depending on player and/or receiver support:

- Over 6 or 8 RCA connectors as analog audio, using the player's internal decoder and digital-to-analog converter (DAC).
- Over HDMI 1.1 (or higher) connections as 6 or 8-channel linear PCM, using the player's decoder and the AV receiver's DAC.
- Over HDMI 1.3 (or higher) connections as the original Dolby TrueHD bitstream encapsulated in MAT (Metadata-Enhanced Audio Transport) frames, with decoding and DAC both done by the AV receiver. This is the transport mode mandated by Dolby Atmos.

Because S/PDIF does not have sufficient bandwidth to carry a TrueHD bitstream, or more than two channels of PCM audio, using S/PDIF requires either falling back to a disc's Dolby Digital track or mixing the TrueHD track down to stereo.
