= Open file format =

Published specification for storing digital data

An open file format is a file format for storing digital data, defined by an openly published specification usually maintained by a standards organization, and which can be used and implemented by anyone. An open file format is licensed with an open license. For example, an open format can be implemented by both proprietary and free and open-source software, using the typical software licenses used by each. In contrast to open file formats, closed file formats are considered trade secrets.

Depending on the definition, the specification of an open format may require a fee to access or, very rarely, contain other restrictions. The range of meanings is similar to that of the term open standard.

== Specific definitions ==
=== UK government ===
In 2012 the UK Government created the policy Open Standards Principles, stating that the Open Standards Principles apply to every aspect of government IT and that Government technology must remain open to everyone. They have seven principles for selecting open standards for use in government, following these principals many open formats were adopted, notably Open Document Format (ODF). The seven principles for selecting open standards for use in the UK government are:

- Open standards must meet user needs
- Open standards must give suppliers equal access to government contracts
- Open standards must support flexibility and change
- Open standards must support sustainable cost
- Select open standards using well-informed decisions
- Select open standards using fair and transparent processes
- Specify and implement open standards using fair and transparent processes

=== US government ===
Within the framework of Open Government Initiative, the federal government of the United States adopted the Open Government Directive, according to which: "An open format is one that is platform independent, machine readable, and made available to the public without restrictions that would impede the re-use of that information".

=== State of Minnesota ===
The State of Minnesota defines the criteria for open, XML-based file formats as follows:

- The format is interoperable among diverse internal and external platforms and applications
- The format is fully published and available royalty-free
- The format is implemented by multiple vendors
- The format is controlled by an open industry organization with a well-defined inclusive process for evolution of the standard

=== Commonwealth of Massachusetts ===
The Commonwealth of Massachusetts defines open formats as "specifications for data file formats that are based on an underlying open standard, developed by an open community, affirmed and maintained by a standards body and are fully documented and publicly available."

The Enterprise Technical Reference Model (ETRM) classifies four formats as "Open Formats":

1. OASIS Open Document Format For Office Applications (OpenDocument) v. 1.1
2. Ecma-376 Office Open XML Formats (Open XML)
3. Hypertext Document Format v. 4.01
4. Plain Text Format

=== Sun Microsystems ===
Sun Microsystems defined the criteria for open formats as follows:

- The format is based on an underlying open standard
- The format is developed through a publicly visible, community-driven process
- The format is affirmed and maintained by a vendor-independent standards organization
- The format is fully documented and publicly available
- The format does not contain proprietary extensions

=== The Linux Information Project ===
According to The Linux Information Project, the term open format should refer to "any format that is published for anyone to read and study but which may or may not be encumbered by patents, copyrights or other restrictions on use" – as opposed to a free format which is not encumbered by any copyrights, patents, trademarks or other restrictions.

== Examples of open formats ==
Open formats (in the royalty-free and free access sense) include:

- PNG — a raster image format originally standardized by ISO/IEC and as an informational IETF RFC but from June 24, 2025 by W3C.
- FLAC — lossless audio codec
- WebM — a video/audio container format
- HTML — is the main markup language for creating web pages and other information that can be displayed in a web browser.
- gzip — for compression
- CSS — style sheet format usually used with (X)HTML, standardized by W3C
- ABC notation — Human readable musical notation for computers.

The following formats are open (royalty-free with a one-time fee on the standard):

- Office Open XML: the ECMA version is downloadable for no charge, but the newer ISO versions require a fee;
- OpenDocument: As adopted by the UK Government in 2012 to meet their open standards principles, for Government technology to remain open to everyone.
- C language: royalty-free, but ISO standard requires a fee (drafts available for no charge);
- PDF: an ISO-standardized file format for reliable document exchange across platforms;

== See also ==
- Open standard
- Open source
- Openness
- Embrace, extend, and extinguish
- List of open-source codecs
- Open educational resources
- Open system
- Free content
- Network effect
- Proprietary file format
- Vendor lock-in
