= Comparison of streaming media software =

This is a comparison of streaming media systems. A more complete list of streaming media systems is also available.

== General ==
The following tables compare general and technical information for a number of streaming media systems both audio and video. Please see the individual systems' linked articles for further information.

Name	Creator	First Public Release (yyyy-MM-dd)	Latest Stable Version (Release Date)	Latest Release Date	Cost (USD)	license	Media
Adobe Media Server	Macromedia/Adobe Systems//Veriskope Inc	2002-07-9	5.0.16 (2020-2-15)	2020-2-15	Free Developer and Trial licenses; Subscription Licenses at $33/month; Standard Perpetual License at $995; Amazon Marketplace license starting at $0.13/hour	proprietary	Video, Audio, Data
Ant Media Server	Ant Media Inc.	2017	2.12 / 12-12-2024	2.12	Free Trial License, Monthly, Annual and Perpetual License Offerings	Proprietary	Video, Audio, Data
atmosph3re	Guillaume Carrier	2005-08-15	3.0.7 (2015-10-31)	2015-10-31	$30 perpetual license	proprietary	Audio
Darwin Streaming Server	Apple Inc.	1999-03-16	6.0.3 (2007-05-10)	2007-05-10	Free	APSL	Audio/Video
Feng	LSCube	2007-05-31	2009-10-14	2009-10-04	Free	GPL	Audio/Video
Firefly	Ron Pedde	?	0.2.4.2 (2008-04-19)	2008-04-19	Free	GPL	Audio
Helix DNA Server	RealNetworks	2003-01-22	11.1 (2006-06-10)	2006-06-10	Free	RCSL/RPSL	Audio/Video
Helix Universal Server	RealNetworks	1994-01-01	15.2.1 (2014-09-16)	2014-09-16	Free for 12 months (Basic) and $1,000-$10,000	proprietary	Audio/Video
Icecast	Xiph.Org Foundation	1998-12	2.4.4 (2018-10-31)	2018-10-31	Free	GPL	Audio
IIS Media Services	Microsoft	2008-11-07	4.1 (2011-11-09)	2011-11-09	Free	proprietary	Audio/Video/Data
Lyrion Music Server	Logitech/LMS Community	2001-09-16	8.5.2 (2024-05-20)	2024-05-20	Free	GPLv2	Audio
Nimble Streamer	Softvelum	2013	3.7.1-5 (2020-10-27)	2020-10-27	Free	proprietary	Audio/Video
OvenMediaEngine	AirenSoft	2019-05-23	0.16.8 (2024-07-19)	2024-07-19	Free	AGPLv3	Audio/Video
OpenBroadcaster	OpenBroadcaster	2003	5.0.0 (2018-01-27)	2018-01-27	Free	AGPLv3	Audio/Video
Open Broadcaster Software	OBS Project	2012-9-01	30.0.2 (2023-12-10)	2023-12-10	Free	GPL v2	Audio/Video
Plex (software)	Plex Media Server	2008-07-08	1.15.6.1079 (2019-05-15)	2019-05-15	Free	proprietary	Audio/Video
Red5 (open source)	Infrared5/community	2003-09-22	1.0.9 (2017-06-11)	2018-12-13	Free	Apache License v2	Audio/Video/Data
SHOUTcast	Nullsoft	1998-12	2.4.7 (Build 256) (2015-03-31)	2015-03-31	Free	proprietary	Audio
Unreal Media Server	Unreal Streaming Technologies	2003-09-15	15.0 (2023-01-03)	2023-01-03	$995 perpetual license	proprietary	Audio/Video
VLC media player	VideoLAN	?	2.2.4 (2016-06-05)	2016-06-05	Free	GPL v2	Audio/Video
Windows Media Services	Microsoft	1996-12-10	9.6 (2010-04-05)	2010-04-05	Free	proprietary	Audio/Video
Wowza Streaming Engine	Wowza Media Systems	2007-02-17	4.8.5 build 20200616153358 (2020-06-17)	2020-06-17	Free Developer and Trial licenses; Subscription Licenses at $125/month; Perpetual Pro License at $1995; Amazon EC2 with embedded license starting at $0.15/hour	proprietary	Audio/Video/Data
xiu	Harlan Chen	2020-08-16	0.13.0 (2024-08-11)	2024-08-11	Free	MIT	Audio/Video

== Operating system support ==
Name	Windows	macOS	Linux	Unix
Adobe Media Server	Yes	Yes	Yes	No
atmosph3re	Yes	No	No	No
Darwin Streaming Server	Yes	Yes	No	Yes
Firefly	Yes	?	Yes	Yes
Helix DNA Server	Yes	?	Yes	Yes
Helix Universal Server	Yes	No	Yes	Yes
Icecast	Yes	Yes	Yes	Yes
IIS Media Services	Yes	No	No	No
Lyrion Music Server	Yes	Yes	Yes	Yes
Nimble Streamer	Yes	Yes	Yes	No
OvenMediaEngine	Yes (with Docker)	Yes (with Docker)	Yes	No
OpenBroadcaster	No	No	Yes	?
Open Broadcaster Software	Yes	Yes	Yes	?
Plex (software)	Yes	Yes	Yes	Yes
Red5 (open source)	Yes	Yes	Yes	Yes
SHOUTcast	Yes	Yes	Yes	Yes
Unreal Media Server	Yes	No	No	No
VLC media player	Yes	Yes	Yes	Yes
Windows Media Services	Yes	No	No	No
Wowza Streaming Engine	Yes	Yes	Yes	Yes
xiu	Yes	Yes	Yes	Yes

== Container format support ==
Information about what digital container formats are supported.

Name	3GP	AVI	ASF	QuickTime	Ogg	OGM	Matroska	MP4	MPEG-TS	FLV	ABR	WebM
Adobe Media Server	?	?	?	?	?	?	?	Yes	No	Yes	Yes	?
atmosph3re	?	?	?	?	?	?	?	Yes	?	?	?	?
Darwin Streaming Server	Yes	?	?	Yes	?	?	?	Yes	No	No	No	?
Firefly	?	No	?	?	Yes	?	?	?	?	?	?	?
Helix DNA Server	?	No	No	No	No	No	No	No	No	No	?	?
Helix Universal Server	Yes	No	Yes	Yes	Yes	No	No	Yes	Yes	Yes	Yes	?
Icecast	?	Yes	?	?	Yes	?	?	?	?	No	No	Yes
IIS Media Services	Yes	Yes	Yes	Yes	Yes	Yes	Yes	Yes	Yes	Yes	Yes	?
Nimble Streamer	No	Yes	No	No	No	No	Yes	Yes	Yes	Yes	Yes	?
OvenMediaEngine	No	Yes	No	No	Yes	No	Yes	Yes	Yes	Yes	Yes	Yes
OpenBroadcaster	No	Yes	No	Yes	Yes	Yes	No	Yes	?	No	?	?
Red5 (open source)	Yes	No	No	Yes	No	No	No	Yes	Yes	Yes	Yes	?
SHOUTcast	?	Yes	?	?	Yes	?	?	?	?	No	No	?
Unreal Media Server	Yes	Yes	Yes	Yes	Yes	Yes	Yes	Yes	Yes	Yes	?	?
VLC media player	?	Yes	?	Yes	Yes	?	Yes	Yes	Yes	Yes	?	?
Windows Media Services	?	?	Yes	?	?	?	?	?	?	No	No	?
Wowza Streaming Engine	Yes	No	No	Yes	No	No	No	Yes	Yes	Yes	Yes	?
xiu	No	No	No	No	No	No	No	No	Yes	Yes	No	No

== Protocol support ==
Information about which internet protocols are supported for broadcasting streaming media content.

Name	HTTP	MPEG DASH	WebRTC	RTSP	MMS	RTP	RTCP	UDP	TCP	RTMP	MPEG TS	Real Data Transport	Web sockets	HLS	DASH	SRTP
Adobe Media Server	Yes (HTTP Live Streaming, HTTP Dynamic Streaming)	?	No	No	No	No	No	Yes	Yes	Yes	No	Yes	Yes	Yes	?	?
atmosph3re	Yes	?	?	?	?	?	?	?	?	?	?	?				
Darwin Streaming Server	No	?	?	Yes	No	Yes	Yes	?	?	?	?	?				
Firefly	?	?	?	?	?	?	?	?	?	?	?	?				
Helix DNA Server	Yes	No	No	Yes	No	Yes	No	Yes	Yes	?	?	Yes				
Helix Universal Server	Yes (HTTP Live Streaming, MPEG-DASH, HTTP Progressive Streaming)	Yes	No	Yes	Yes	Yes	Yes	Yes	Yes	Yes	No	Yes				
Icecast	Yes	?	?	No	No	No	No	?	?	?	?	?				
IIS Media Services	Yes	?	No	No	No	No	No	No	No	No	No	No				
Nimble Streamer	Yes (HTTP Live Streaming, Smooth Streaming)	Yes	No	Yes	No	Yes	No	Yes	Yes	Yes	Yes	No	Yes	Yes	Yes	
OvenMediaEngine	Yes	Yes	Yes	Yes	No	Yes	Yes	Yes	Yes	Yes	Yes	No	Yes	Yes	Yes	No
OpenBroadcaster	Yes	No	No	Yes	No	Yes	Yes	Yes	Yes	No	?	Yes				
Red5 (open source)	Yes	No	In Development	No	No	No	No	No	Yes	Yes (RTMP, RTMPE, RTMPTE, RTMPT, RTMPS, RTMP Dynamic Streaming)	No	Yes	Yes	?		No
SHOUTcast	Yes	?	?	No	No	No	No	?	?	?	?	?				
Unreal Media Server	Yes (HTTP Live Streaming, Smooth Streaming)	No	Yes	Yes	Yes	Yes	Yes	Yes	Yes	Yes (RTMP, RTMPT, Dynamic RTMP)	Yes	No	Yes	Yes		Yes
VLC media player	Yes	?	No	Yes	Yes	Yes	Yes	Yes	Yes	Yes	Yes	?		Yes		
Windows Media Services	Yes (WM-HTTP)	?	No	Yes (WM-RTSP)	Yes, for WMS 9.0 and earlier; removed in WMS 2008 (9.5)	Yes (WM-RTSP)	No	Yes (WM-RTSP/U and MS-MSB)	Yes (WM-RTSP/T and WM-HTTP)	No	No	No				
Wowza Streaming Engine	Yes (HTTP Live Streaming, Smooth Streaming, HTTP Dynamic Streaming)	Yes	Yes	Yes	No	Yes	Yes	Yes	Yes	Yes (RTMP, RTMPE, RTMPTE, RTMPT, RTMPS, RTMP Dynamic Streaming)	Yes	No	No	Yes	Yes	
xiu	Yes (HTTP Live Streaming)	No	Yes (Whip/Whep)	Yes	No	Yes (WM-RTSP)	No	Yes (WM-RTSP/U)	Yes (WM-RTSP/T)	Yes (RTMP)	Yes	No	No	Yes	No	No
Name	HTTP	MPEG DASH	WebRTC	RTSP	MMS	RTP	RTCP	UDP	TCP	RTMP	MPEG TS	Real Data Transport	Web sockets	HLS	DASH	SRTP

== Features ==
Name	Client Playback Synchronization	Web Interface	Graphical user interface	iOS SDK	Android SDK	JavaScript SDK
Lyrion Music Server	Yes	Yes	No			
Red5 (open source)	No	Yes	Yes	No	No	No
VLC media player	Yes	Yes	Yes			

== See also ==
- Community radio
- Comparison of video hosting services
- Content delivery network
- Digital television
- E-commerce
- Internet radio
- Internet radio device
- Streaming television
- IPTV
- List of Internet radio stations
- Comparison of music streaming services
- Multicast
- P2PTV
- Protection of Broadcasts and Broadcasting Organizations Treaty
- Push technology
- Streaming media
- IBM Cloud Video
- Webcast
- Streaming television
