= List of RTMP software =

List of software that implements the Real-Time Messaging Protocol, primarily known from Adobe Flash.

== RTMP live video encoder software ==
- Adobe Media Flash Live Encoder
- FFmpeg
- Nimble Streamer Transcoder
- Open Broadcaster Software
- XSplit Broadcaster
- Wirecast
- Wowza Transcoder, a module part of the Wowza Streaming Engine

== RTMP server software ==
The primary motivation for RTMP was to be a protocol for playing Flash video (Adobe Flash Player) maintaining persistent connections and allows low-latency communication, but in July 2017, Adobe announced that it would end support for Flash Player at the end of 2020, and continued to encourage the use of open HTML5 standards in place of Flash.

Due to this, RTMP streaming support is declining rapidly, but it is still very useful for broadcasting live, because of its low-latency. The broadcaster ingests the stream through a RTMP server which then encodes and sends the resultant stream to a HLS (HTTP Live Streaming) URL. The stream can then be viewed on a number of players and devices including desktops, smartphones and social media sites.

Some full implementation RTMP servers are:

- Adobe Flash Media Server
- FreeSWITCH RTMP media streaming available with mod_rtmp and allow interconnecting with other VoIP protocols (SIP, H.323), etc.
- Nginx with nginx-rtmp-module
- Nimble Streamer has RTMP streaming, publishing and re-publishing
- Helix Universal Server can support RTMP, RTMPT and RTMPS streaming for live and on-demand content. (Discontinued in 2014)
- Red5 Media Server is a Java open source project.
- OvenMediaEngine is an open source project that receives RTMP and transmits it with low latency.
- Wowza Streaming Engine has full support for RTMP streaming for live streams and VOD
- WebORB Integration Server (RTMP/RTMPT/RTMPS messaging and media streaming available for .NET and Java Enterprise, Community and Cloud editions)
- Flashphoner Web Call Server – a multi-protocol server (including SIP, RTMP and other)

== Client software ==
Application	Platform	Description
Adobe Flash Player (web browser plug-in)	Windows, OS X, ChromeOS, Linux	The most widely adopted RTMP client, which supports playback of audio and video streamed from RTMP servers.
Gnash (web browser plug-in/media player)	Windows, Linux	An open source replacement for the Flash Player, intends to support RTMP streaming for Linux.
VLC media player	Windows, OS X, Linux, iOS, Android	As of version 2.1+ Has partial support for playing RTMP streams (not RTMPE).
MPC-HC	Windows	As of version 1.7.8+ Can open rtmp streams if started from command prompt with the URL as argument, or with entering the URL into the "Open File..." dialog.
Kodi	Windows, OS X, Linux, iOS (jailbroken), Android	Has partial support for playing RTMP streams (not RTMPE).
