= Flashphoner Web Call Server =

Web Call Server is unified intermedia server software developed by Flashphoner. It is a server-side platform, implemented in Java, dedicated for streaming video over wide range of communication protocols, including:

- browsers ( Chrome, Firefox, Opera, Safari, Microsoft Edge, Internet Explorer),
- VoIP online conference services,
- softphones,
- SIP switches,
- IP cameras,
- streaming servers software, i.e. Adobe Flash Media Server and Wowza Streaming Engine.

Web Call Server can be configured for operation in networks with various topology, e.g. working behind corporate NAT and serving external clients using public IP address.

== History ==
2010 - Created an extension / plugin for Wowza Media Server, which allows you to work with SIP.

2011 – Had made design to replace the Wowza Media Server with self developed software based on RTMFP protocol, which was at that time the most advanced protocol streaming video with minimal delay. As a result was created RTMFP SIP Gateway, which allowed to make SIP calls from a browser with support for Flash Player.

2013 - The rapid development of WebRTC technology made to implement support of this technology. As a result, version Web Call Server 3 supported both protocols (WebRTC and RTMFP) for SIP calls from a browser. In Chrome, Firefox, and Opera browsers calls began to stream directly from the browser without Flash Player.

2015 – Based on the modern technological basis was issued Web Call Server 4 version, which allowed not only to make SIP calls, but also to use the product in a video streaming server mode and broadcasts. There were two sets of options: calls and streaming video. Block 'call' was responsible for the integration with the SIP, and 'streaming' block - for standard video streaming functions, such as the publication of an arbitrary number of video streams, playback of video streams from the server, security, etc.

2016 - In addition to RTMP and WebRTC have been added support for new additional protocols and case studies: Websockets protocol for streaming to iOS Safari, RTSP protocol broadcasts from IP cameras and distribution streams, RTMP protocol for publishing SIP-calls on the CDN network, WebRTC-record calls, iOS SDK, and official support for Amazon EC2 servers. All of these innovations have been combined into a version of Web Call Server 5.

== Formats, Protocols, Codecs ==
Supported in the current release

- Formats
  - HTML5 / Websockets
  - WebRTC
  - Flash
  - REST
  - JSON
- Protocols
  - SIP
  - RTP
  - RTSP
  - HTTP/HTTPS
- Codecs
  - Audio codecs - G.711, Opus, Speex, G.722, G.729
  - Video codecs - VP8, H.264

== See also ==
- Wowza Streaming Engine
- Red5 (media server)
- Jitsi
