= OvenMediaEngine =

Open-source low-latency streaming server

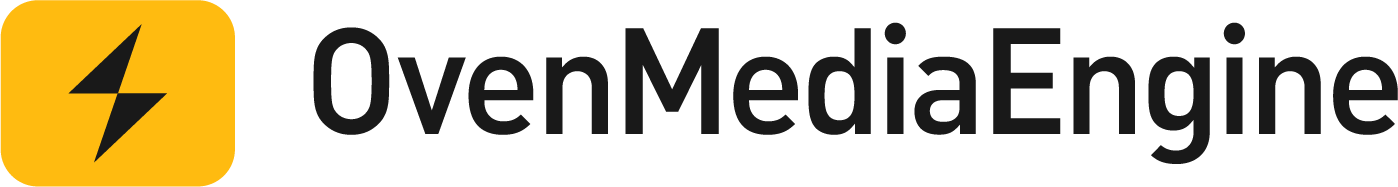
- Other names: OME
- Developer: OvenMedia Labs
- Release: v0.9.0 / 23 May 2019; 7 years ago
- Stable release: v0.20.5 / 26 March 2026; 5 months ago
- Written in: C++
- Operating system: Ubuntu 18+, Rocky Linux 9+, AlmaLinux 9+, Fedora 28+
- Platform: Docker
- Type: Open-Source Low-Latency Streaming Server/Solution/Software
- License: AGPL v3.0
- Website: https://ovenmedialabs.com
- Repository: https://github.com/OvenMediaLabs/OvenMediaEngine

OvenMediaEngine (OME) is a low-latency streaming server with large-scale and high-definition that OvenMedia Labs Inc (formerly AirenSoft Co., Ltd.) released as open-source software via GitHub in December 2018. The main programming language used is C++, and the first update was on May 23, 2019.

OvenMediaEngine became a member of the SRT Alliance in October 2018, was certified as Good Software Level 1 (ISO/IEC 25023, 25041, and 25051) in 2022, and received the South Korean Prime Minister's Award and the Minister of Science and ICT Award in 2022.

== Usage ==
OvenMediaEngine uses WebRTC for sub-second latency streaming and Low Latency HLS (HLS version 7+ based on fragmented MP4 containers, LL-HLS) for low-latency streaming depending on the system, network, and browser environment. If you use OvenMediaEngine and your environment cannot transmit low-latency streaming, it also supports general streaming using the legacy protocol as HTTP Live Streaming (HLS).

OvenMediaEngine can ingest media sources over WebRTC, SRT, RTMP, RTSP, and MPEG2-TS protocols through commonly used stream tools such as Open Broadcaster Software (OBS), Video camera, and Web browser with Webcam, encode them to Adaptive Bitrate Streaming (ABR) with the embedded live transcoder, and stream them to viewers over WebRTC and Low-Latency HLS. It is also possible to stream using legacy HLS for wider compatibility.

== History ==
- In October 2025, Real-time speech-to-text (STT) support was announced.
- In June 2025, Enhanced RTMP (E-RTMP) support was announced.
- In March 2025, HEVC codec support for WebRTC (WHIP Ingress) was announced.
- In January 2025, Simulcast for WebRTC (WHIP Ingress) support was announced.
- In January 2025, SRT Publisher (Egress) support for live streaming via SRT was announced.
- In June 2024, Re-support for legacy HLS (version 3+) based on TS containers and support for X-Forwarded-For and X-Real-IP to <AccessControl> was announced.
- In January 2024, the Multiplex Provider support was announced.
- In December 2023, <TranscodeWebhook> support was announced.
- In November 2023, the Scheduled Channel (Pre-recorded Live) feature was announced.
- In September 2023, Digital rights management (DRM) support for LL-HLS was announced.
- In July 2023, SRT Push Publisher support was announced.
- In May 2023, High-Efficiency Video Coding (HEVC) support for SRT Provider and LL-HLS Publisher was announced.
- In April 2023, a Launcher for Docker with easy installation was announced.
  - In July 2024, Review: OvenMeidaEngine using OME Docker Launcher
- In March 2023, Support for the LL-HLS Multilingual Audio and Conditional Encoding feature was announced.
- In February 2023, Support for WebRTC-HTTP Ingestion Protocol (WHIP) and IPv6 address was announced.
- In January 2023, Support for enhanced WebRTC Provider was announced.
- In December 2022, Support for Digital Video Recorder (DVR) for LL-HLS was announced.
- In September 2022, the LL-HLS Dump feature for VoD Services was announced.
- In May 2022, Support for Low-Latency HLS (LL-HLS) output and Adaptive Bitrate Streaming (ABR) for LL-HLS was announced.
- In February 2022, the OvenMediaEngine license changed from GPLv3 to AGPLv3 was announced.
- In January 2022, Support for Adaptive Bitrate Streaming (ABR) for WebRTC was announced.

== License ==
OvenMediaEngine is licensed under the GNU Affero General Public License version 3 (AGPLv3) starting from February 16, 2022.

- On February 16, 2022, when OvenMediaEngine was updated to 0.13.0, it was licensed under the AGPLv3.
- On August 25, 2021, when OvenMediaEngine was updated to 0.12.2, the policy was changed to licensed under the GNU General Public License version 3 (GPLv3).
- On May 23, 2015, when OvenMediaEngine was first released as open source, it was licensed under the GNU General Public License version 2 (GPLv2).

== Good Software Level 1 Certification ==
On July 18, 2022, OvenMediaEngine was certified as Good Software Level 1 by the South Korea Telecommunications Technology Association after being tested on international standards (ISO/IEC 25023, 25041, and 25051).

== Awards ==
- December 6, 2022, OvenMediaEngine received an award from the Prime Minister of South Korea at the Korea SW Awards.
- September 19, 2022, OvenMediaEngine received an award from the Minister of Science and ICT of South Korea at the Korea SW Awards.

== See also ==
- Comparison of streaming media software
- Wowza Streaming Engine
- Red5 Media Server
- Nimble Streamer
- Gstreamer
