= QuickTime Streaming Server =

- Developer(s): Apple Computer
- Stable release: 6
- Operating system: Mac OS X Server
- Type: server
- License: Proprietary commercial software
- Website: www.apple.com/quicktime/streamingserver/

QuickTime Streaming Server (QTSS) is a server or service daemon that was built into Apple's Mac OS X Server until OS X Server 10.6.8. It delivers video and audio on request to users over a computer network, including the Internet. Its primary GUI configuration tool is QTSS Publisher and its web-based administration port is 1220. It also uses port UDP/7100. When used in conjunction with QuickTime Broadcaster, it is possible to deliver live real-time video and audio to multiple users over networks.

The protocol used has since been superseded with HTTP Live Streaming used in iOS and Mac OS.

== See also ==
- Darwin Streaming Server
- Helix Universal Server
- HTTP Live Streaming
- Wowza Media Server
