= Darwin Streaming Server =

- Original author(s): Apple Inc.
- Developer(s): Apple Inc.
- Initial release: March 16, 1999
- Stable release: 6.0.3 / May 10, 2007
- Operating system: OS X, Linux, Windows
- Type: RTSP server
- License: Apple Public Source License
- Website: http://dss.macosforge.org/

Darwin Streaming Server (DSS) was the first open sourced RTP/RTSP streaming server. It was released March 16, 1999 and is a fully featured RTSP/RTP media streaming server capable of streaming a variety of media types including H.264/MPEG-4 AVC, MPEG-4 Part 2 and 3GP.

== Development ==
Developed by Apple, it is the open source equivalent of QuickTime Streaming Server, and is based on its code.

== Ports ==
The initial DSS source code release compiled only on OS X, but external developers quickly ported the code to Linux, FreeBSD, Solaris, Tru64 Unix, Mac OS 9 and Windows.

Source code is available as a release download or as development code via CVS.

== See also ==
- HTTP Live Streaming – Apple's video/audio streaming server protocol
- Helix Universal Server – Multiformat streaming server from RealNetworks
- Wowza Media Server – a unified streaming server from Wowza Media Systems
