= Content delivery platform =

Web content service

A content delivery platform (CDP) is a software as a service (SaaS) content service, similar to a content management system (CMS), that utilizes embedded software code to deliver web content. Instead of the installation of software on client servers, a CDP feeds content through embedded code snippets, typically via JavaScript widget, Flash widget or server-side Ajax.

Content delivery platforms are not content delivery networks, which are utilized for large web media and do not depend on embedded software code. A CDP is utilized for all types of web content, even text-based content.

Alternatively, a content delivery platform can be utilized to import a variety of syndicated content into one central location and then re-purposed for web syndication.

The term content delivery platform was coined by Feed.Us software architect John Welborn during a presentation to the Chicago Web Developers Association.

In late 2007, two blog comment services launched utilizing CDP-based services. Intense Debate and Disqus both employ JavaScript widgets to display and collect blog comments on websites.

== Notable Content delivery platforms ==
- Akamai Technologies
- Instart Logic
- Fluid Topics

== See also ==
- Web content management system
- Viddler, YouTube, Ustream embeddable streaming video
