= Astra (software) =

- Original author(s): Andrey Dyldin
- Developer(s): Cesbo Ltd.
- Stable release: 4.4 (July 25, 2015); 5.64 (November 22, 2018)
- Written in: ANSI C
- Operating system: Linux
- Type: Television, digital video broadcasting
- License: 4.4 GPLv3; 5.64 Proprietary
- Website: cesbo.com

Astra is a professional software to organize digital broadcasting service for TV operators and broadcasters, internet service providers, hotels, etc. Astra is an acronym for "advanced streaming application".

Astra supports many protocols and standards to receive channels from different sources. Received channels prepares and transmits into the IP network. Built-in scripting language (Lua) allow to customize business logic of the application.

== Features ==
- Data format: MPEG-TS
- Receiving formats and standards:
  - DVB-S, DVB-T, DVB-C, ATSC, ASI
  - RTSP
  - HTTP
  - HLS
  - UDP, RTP
  - MPEG-TS files

== DVB, ATSC, ISDB-T ==
  - DVB, ATSC, ISDB-T
    - Introduction to DVB Adapter Tuning
    - SAT>IP Client
    - Options for DVB-S/S2
    - Options for DVB-C
    - Options for DVB-T/T2 and ISDB-T
    - Scan DVB Adapter
    - Descrambling channels with External DVB-CI
  - IP Sources
    - Receiving HLS
    - Receiving HTTP MPEG-TS
    - Receiving MPTS via UDP
    - Receiving RSTP
    - Receiving SRT ( caller или listenner )
    - Receiving UDP/RTP
- Transmitting formats and standards:
  - HTTP
  - HLS
  - UDP, RTP
  - MPEG-TS files
  - DVB
- Data processing:
  - Descrambling: DVB-CI
  - MPEG-TS demultiplexing – extract single channel from the multi-program transport stream
  - MPEG-TS multiplexing – combine several channels into single multi-program transport stream
  - DVB-T2 MI decapsulation
  - Analyzing MPEG-TS streams
  - Redundancy for incoming streams
  - MPEG-TS PID remapping and filtering
- Other:
  - Scripting language: Lua
  - Web-Interface
  - REST API for management
  - HbbTV
  - Telemetry and monitoring
  - Access authorization
  - EPG export (XMLTV or JSON)
