= QuickTime Broadcaster =

Media streaming software

- Developer: Apple Inc.
- Stable release: 1.5.3 / 27 January 2009; 17 years ago
- Operating system: Mac OS X
- Type: Server software
- License: Freeware
- Website: www.apple.com/quicktime/broadcaster/

QuickTime Broadcaster is media streaming software produced by Apple Inc. for Mac OS X. The software is an audio and video RTP/RTSP server. It is separate from Apple's QuickTime Streaming Server, as it is not a service daemon but a desktop application. It is able to stream live video and audio over a network in any QuickTime supported streaming codec.

Most QuickTime software was functionally defunct as of the release of macOS Catalina in 2019, with most functionality replaced by AVFoundation.
