= Digital program insertion =

Broadcasting technology to insert contents

Digital program insertion (DPI) allows cable headends and broadcast affiliates to insert locally generated commercials and short programs into remotely distributed regional programs before they are delivered to home viewers.

Digital program insertion also refers to a specific technology which allows an MPEG transport stream to be spliced into a currently flowing MPEG transport stream seamlessly and with little or no artifacts. The controlling signaling used to initiate an MPEG is referred to as an SCTE-35 message. The communication API between MPEG splicers and content delivery servers or ad insertion servers is referred to as SCTE30 messages.
