= Sorenson Squeeze =

Video encoding software

- Developers: Sorenson Media, Inc.
- Release: October 29, 2001; 24 years ago
- Stable release: 10.0
- Operating system: Windows 7/8, Mac OS X 10.8 or greater
- Available in: English
- Type: Video compression
- License: Proprietary
- Website: www.sorensonmedia.com

Sorenson Squeeze was a software video encoding tool used to compress and convert video and audio files on Mac OS X or Windows operating systems. It was sold as a standalone tool and was also bundled with Avid Media Composer.

== History ==
Sorenson Squeeze was first announced on July 17, 2001, as the first variable bit rate (VBR) compression application for Mac OS X, and was released on October 29 of that same year. By March 2002, Sorenson Squeeze became available for Windows OS. Sorenson Squeeze was originally released as a tool for encoding videos for the Web and QuickTime playback but began adding new codecs as more versions were released.

The software was discontinued by Sorenson in January 2019, and was no longer offered as part of Avid Media Composer.

== Features ==
Squeeze included a number of features to improve video & audio quality. Features included: GPU accelerated H.264 encoding, adaptive bitrate encoding, HD encoding and Dolby certified AC3 Audio. Intelligent encoding presets available in Squeeze included: x265 (H.265) MainConcept H.264 and MainConcept H.264 CUDA. Adaptive bitrate encoding allows for optimal bitrate and error resilience based on network conditions, resulting in a dynamic adjustment of the video bitstream being delivered.

It encoded to multiple formats including QuickTime, Windows Media, Flash Video, Silverlight, WebM & WMV. It uses multiple codecs, including the Sorenson codecs SV3 Pro and Spark, H.265, H.264, H.263, VP6, VC1, MPEG2, and many others. Squeeze operates on the Apple Macintosh and Microsoft Windows operating systems. Squeeze offers native plugins to Avid, Apple Final Cut Pro and Adobe Premiere (CS4, CS5) NLEs.

Each copy of Squeeze included the Dolby Certified AC3 Consumer encoder. Squeeze also included a simplified review and approval process, which allows the user to automatically send secure, password protected videos for immediate review. Instant feedback is received via Web or mobile.

== Versions ==
- Sorenson Squeeze was released on October 29, 2001.
- Sorenson Squeeze for Macromedia Flash MX was released on March 14, 2002.
- Sorenson Squeeze 3 for MPEG-4 was released in January 2003.
- Sorenson Squeeze 3 Compression Suite was released in January 2003.
- Sorenson Squeeze 5 was released on March 31, 2008.
- Sorenson Squeeze was updated to version 5.1 on May 11, 2009.
- Sorenson Squeeze 6 was released on November 3, 2009.
- Sorenson Squeeze 7 was released January 25, 2011.
- Sorenson Squeeze 11 was released August 27, 2016.

== Awards ==
- Streaming Media magazine Readers’ Choice Award for Encoding Software for 2007, 2008, 2009 and 2010.
- 2008 Vanguard Award from Digital Content Producer magazine

== Squeeze 7 system requirements ==
Windows

- Pentium IV-based computer or greater
- Windows XP, Vista or 7
- 32- and 64-bit compatible (including AVID 64-bit update); Faster performance on 64-bit systems
- 512 MB RAM
- 120 MB available hard drive space
- QuickTime 7.2 or later
- DirectX 9.0b or later

Macintosh

- Intel-based processor
- Mac OS 10.4 or later
- 32- and 64-bit compatible; Faster performance on 64-bit systems
- 512 MB RAM
- 120 MB available hard drive space
- QuickTime 7.2 or later

== See also ==
- List of video editing software
