= Nimble Streamer =

Software media server

- Developer(s): Softvelum
- Stable release: 4.1.8-1 / February 14, 2025; 31 days ago
- Operating system: Linux, Windows, Raspbian
- Type: Enterprise and carrier class server software
- License: Proprietary
- Website: softvelum.com/nimble/

Nimble Streamer is a software media server developed by Softvelum. The server is used for streaming of live and on-demand video and audio to desktop computers, mobile devices, internet-connected TV sets, IPTV set-top boxes and other network-connected devices. Its first stable version 1.0.0-1 was released on October, 21st, 2013, with a number of preliminary versions done before that. The release cycle is intensive and introduces a new version every week or less. Nimble Streamer was the finalist in Streaming Media European Readers' Choice Awards for 2016 as the Best Streaming Innovation and for 2021 as Hardware/software Server.

== Usage ==
Nimble Streamer is delivered as an application for Linux and Windows. Its basic scenarios include streaming from live sources, streaming from VOD files and cache-aware HTTP re-streaming. For live streaming it takes RTMP, RTSP, MPEG-TS, SRT, UDT and Icecast as input and produces MPEG-DASH, HLS, RTMP, RTSP, MPEG-TS, SRT, UDT, SLDP and Icecast. VOD is available as MP4 transmuxing to HLS and MPEG-DASH for both H.265 and H.264. HEVC is also supported for various live streaming protocols output. MPEG-DASH output is supported in live and VOD modes.

Low Latency HLS is supported in Nimble Streamer starting from version 3.6.3-3.

The developer company is a member of SRT Alliance as a collaborator and contributor of open-source implementation of SRT protocol.

NDI is supported as both input and output.

RIST streaming protocol is supported for input and output.

The program also covers progressive download for multiple formats, with seeking capabilities for HTML5 and Flash playback. HTTP re-streaming covers HLS, MPEG-DASH, HDS and SmoothStreaming. It can be used as a source for peer-to-peer media streaming.

Live Transcoder for Nimble Streamer supports decoding, filtering and encoding for H.264, HEVC, MPEG2, MPEG4, VP8, VP9 video and AAC, MP3, MP2, Speex, PCM G.711 audio.

A premium add-on provides server-side ads insertion with pre-rolls and mid-rolls for HLS, RTMP, SLDP and Icecast live streams, as well as DRM protection with Widevine, PlayReady and FairPlay.

== See also ==
- Wowza Streaming Engine
- Adobe Flash Media Server
