= Yospace =

Yospace Technologies, Ltd.
- Company type: Private
- Industry: IPTV
- Founded: 1999
- Headquarters: Staines
- Key people: Graham Pitman; Chairman; Tim Sewell; CEO; David Springall; CTO
- Website: yospace.com

Yospace is a digital video distribution company. Its technology allows live and on-demand video content to be taken to connected devices such as smartphones, feature phones, tablets and to web browsers with user-targeted ad insertion.

Its clients are primarily broadcasters, multi-service operators, and digital publishers.

Yospace is based in Staines outside London along with many other technology businesses in the so-called M4 corridor.

== Company history ==
=== SmartPhone Emulator ===
Yospace was founded in 1999. Its first product, the SmartPhone Emulator, released in April 2000, was a WAP handset emulator of the Nokia 7110. The product was unique at the time as it was the only solution available to developers that provided an accurate rendering of the handset display. The SmartPhone Emulator was released as a downloadable developer tool and an applet that could be embedded into a web page. The developer tool allowed simultaneous display of a variety of different handsets including those from Nokia, Ericsson, Motorola.

=== User-generated video communities ===
In 2005, Yospace launched a user-generated video community called SeeMeTV in partnership with the mobile operator 3 in the UK, which was launched shortly after as LookAtMe! on the O2 network in the UK. BeOnTV followed on T-Mobile in 2007.

The services offered a means for subscribers to send in videos and pictures via MMS into a moderated gallery from which other community members could download and rate the entries. The service charged for video downloads and paid a percentage of the revenue back to the contributors via PayPal. By March 2006, the operator 3 claimed that over £100,000 had been paid back to contributors.

The company won numerous awards including being voted Number 1 in “Real Business' Top 50 Companies to Watch in Mobile’, and winning ‘Mobile Innovation Award 2006’ from the Mobile Entertainment Forum.

The services since combined into a single community under the name EyeVibe. Yospace sold the service to Australian company Moko.mobi in 2010.

=== Acquisition by EMAP ===
In February 2007, the company was acquired by EMAP for £8.7 million. EMAP was subsequently acquired by Europe's largest privately held publishing group H.Bauer Publishing. In March 2009, as part of Bauer Media's strategy review, it sold its interest in Yospace to private investors for £1. During the period under Bauer ownership, Yospace launched yospaceCDS, a SaaS version of the video technology it had been developing for its own consumer services as a platform for digital publishers, media production houses and software developers alike to take video content out to mobile devices.

=== Acquisition by RTL Group ===
In January 2019, RTL Group announced their planned acquisition of Yospace for up to US$33 million (approx. €29 million), with transaction scheduled for completion on 1 February 2019.

== Yospace today ==
The company is managed by Tim Sewell, CEO and David Springall CTO and co-founder.

Sky, BBC, Canadian Broadcasting Corporation, GSMA, ITN, Thomson Reuters, Vodafone, CBS Interactive, and Hearst Television have used Yospace technology, and with the most recent addition of BT Sport replacing Microsoft Silverlight.
