= Pvserver =

pvServer
- Developer(s): PacketVideo Network Solutions
- Stable release: 4.1 / [June], 2006
- Operating system: Red Hat Linux, Sun Solaris SPARC
- Type: Multimedia framework, Streaming server
- License: Proprietary
- Website: http://www.pvnetsolutions.com

pvServer is a 3GPP/2 standards compliant multimedia server that provides streaming and broadcast services to mobile devices. pvServer is developed by PacketVideo Network Solutions , a wholly owned company of Alcatel-Lucent. pvServer delivers multiple streams of live and pre-recorded audio / video content (MPEG-4, H.263 and H.264, Enhanced aacPlus, etc.) to devices with a 3GPP-compatible player. Besides RTSP, It also supports HTTP and RTMP streaming, all with rate-adaptive capability.

== Overview ==
The pvServer consists of the following modules:

1. The Streaming Module, which is a Unix-based "software appliance" for standards compliant multimedia streaming via RTSP/RTP connections to wireless clients.
2. The Download Module, which is a Unix-based "software appliance" for standards compliant multimedia download via HTTP connection to wireless clients. This is commonly known as HTTP Streaming.
3. The Integration Services Module, which is a Java-based platform for multimedia service development and integration.

== Major Customers ==
- T-Mobile
- Telus
- Orange
