= Viddler =

Online sales training platform

Viddler Inc.

Interactive online video service
- Founded: 2005 (private)
- Headquarters: Bethlehem, Pennsylvania, U.S.
- Website: www.viddler.com

Viddler was an online engagement and training platform. Viddler built a range of tools and products for clients including video contests, subscription stores, training platform, and an employee engagement platform. Viddler's interactive video player was supported with a robust set of APIs that let clients build their own platforms and products.

== History ==
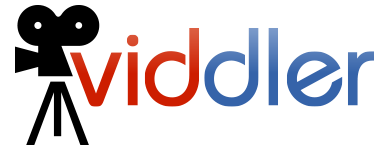
Former logo

Drawing from Viddler patent abstract, showing methods and systems for displaying videos with overlays and tags.

Viddler launched its online video platform in December 2006. On March 3, 2025, Viddler shut down operations.

For over the 18 years, Viddler streamed billions of views on millions of videos for 2000+ clients in over 150 countries on 6 of the seven continents. Over 100 people have been a part of Viddler as employees, interns, contractors, and partners.

The company was headquartered in Bethlehem, Pennsylvania, and was founded in November 2005 by Robert Sandie, Greg Gurevich, Joshua Mann, and Donna DeMarco.

Viddler suspended its free service for non-commercial users. Following a 2011 decision to discontinue new personal accounts, Viddler announced in 2014 that it would close those legacy accounts, giving users the option of opening a paid account or downloading their existing videos.

In 2010, Viddler began focusing less on video enthusiasts and self-generated content hosting and more on business verticals, including corporate communication and training, education, and publishing.

Viddler's online sales training platform included integrated tools for practice and evaluation. Its services offered video-based instructions and optional coaching and allow the consumer to engage with course content through guided assignments and self-recorded practice sessions.
