= Instart =

Defunct American computer technology corporation

- Founded: 2010
- Dissolved: 2020
- Successor: Akamai
- Headquarters: Palo Alto, California, U.S.
- Key people: Sumit Dhawan, CEO; Jony Hartono, CFO; Hariharan Kolam, CTO; Natalie Lambert, CMO; Thirumalesh Reddy, SVP; Mitch Parker, CCO
- Industry: Internet
- Website: www.instart.com

Instart was an American multinational computer technology corporation, headquartered in Palo Alto, California. The company specialized primarily in improving online content delivery speeds. The company also offered software designed to increase online advertising by accelerating the rate at which ads loaded and preventing blockers or filters from blocking ads.

The company had offices in New York, London, Bangalore and Sydney.

On February 27, 2020, Akamai announced that it had acquired Instart's customers and select intellectual property.

== History ==
In 2010, the company was founded in an attempt to improve the speed of downloading and updating video games.

In the fall of 2014, the company started a US$100 million contract buyout program for Akamai customers.

In February 2016, Instart acquired Kwicr, a mobile app accelerator.

In June 2018, the company shortened its name to Instart from Instart Logic. Instart was a shortened form of "Instant Start".

Notable clients included Cafe Media, Edmunds, Bonnier, Ziff Davis, CBS, Tronc, TUI Group, Telstra and Kate Spade.

=== Financing ===
Instart had received $140 million in 6 rounds of funding from 10 investors:

- Series A: In February 2012 Instart Logic received $9 million as first round of funding
- Series B: In April 2013 Instart Logic received $17 million
- Series C: In May 2014 Instart Logic received $26 million
- Series C2: In May 2015, Instart Logic closed a $13 million expansion funding led by new investors Four Rivers Group and Hermes Growth Partners, in addition to existing investors including Andreessen Horowitz, Kleiner Perkins Caufield & Byers and Tenaya Capital
- Series D: In January 2016 Instart Logic received $45 million funding from Geodesic Capital, Telstra Ventures, Stanford-StartX Fund, Harris Barton Asset Management and participation from existing investors
- Series E: In November 2017 Instart Logic closed $30 million of equity funding led by ST Telemedia with all other prior investors participating

== Products ==
Instart products included:

- Instart Digital Experience Cloud
- Cloud and Web Application Performance Optimization
- Mobile Application Performance Optimization
- Image Optimization
- Tag Analytics and Control
- Advertising Acceleration and Viewability Optimization
- Digital Advertising and Marketing Recovery
- Web Application Firewall
- DDOS Attack Protection
- Bot Management and Security
- Instart Content Delivery Network
- Nanovisor
