= Sorenson Media =

American software company

- Type: Private
- Industry: Computer software
- Founder: James Lee Sorenson
- Headquarters: Salt Lake City, Utah, U.S.
- Area served: Worldwide
- Key people: Patrick Nola (CEO)
- Website: sorensonmedia.com

Logo of Sorenson Vision as of 2000

Sorenson Media was an American software company specializing in video encoding technology. Established in December 1995 as Sorenson Vision, the company developed technology which was licensed and ultimately acquired from Utah State University. The company first announced its codec (compression and decompression tool) at a developer’s preview at Macworld Expo in January 1997.

One of the company's best known products is the Sorenson Video codec licensed to Apple Inc. for their QuickTime 3.0 software. Since its release, Sorenson Media’s video encoding technology was used in Apple's trailer web site and video clips for film studios such as Disney, Lucasfilm, MGM, and Paramount, as well as Apple's iTunes music videos, before the switch to the industry standard H.264 format.

The company was led by its chairman and founder James Lee Sorenson (son of James LeVoy Sorenson); its final president and CEO was Patrick Nola. The company filed for Chapter 11 bankruptcy in October 2018, and was acquired at auction by Nielsen Holdings in February 2019 for $11.25 million for their addressable advertising group.

== Technical service for the deaf and Sorenson Communications ==
In 2003 Sorenson released its VP-100 model stand-alone videotelephony product for users with hearing loss. It was designed to output its video to a deaf user's standard television set in order to lower the cost of acquisition. It also provided a remote control, and a video compression codec designed for improved video quality and ease of use with a Video Relay Service (VRS). The product received favorable reviews and is used at educational facilities for the deaf, and elsewhere in the deaf community.

Following the introduction of similar videophones by other electronics manufacturers, the availability of high speed Internet, and sponsored video relay services authorized by the U.S. Federal Communications Commission in 2002, VRS for the deaf underwent rapid growth in the United States.

In May 2005 Sorenson Media split off a new company, Sorenson Communications, which focuses on products for the deaf or hard-of-hearing communities while Sorenson Media would focus on video compression software. In April 2022 the private investment firm Ariel Alternatives acquired a 52.5% ownership stake in Sorenson Communications which valued Sorenson at $1.3 billion.

== Encoding technologies ==
Sorenson codec may refer to any of three proprietary video codecs:

=== Sorenson Video ===
Two versions of Sorenson Video were released, both using SVQ1 as their FourCC.

Version one first appeared with the release of QuickTime 3 on March 30, 1998. The backward-compatible version two was released with QuickTime 4 on March 11, 1999, which mainly included minor improvements and optimizations to the Developer Edition of the encoder, so encoded movies would be backwards compatible with the QuickTime 3 release. Changes for version two were only made to the encoder, not to the compression format. This format uses a YCbCr 4:1:0 chroma subsampling, which means every block of eight pixels share the same color components, which can cause color bleeding across pixels. This was solved in version 3 and the Spark version which both use the more common YCbCr 4:2:0 subsampling. FFmpeg supports decoding of Sorenson Video since 2002, encoding of SVQ1 was added in 2004 for 0.4.9-pre1.

Version two was given wide exposure from the release of the teaser trailer for Star Wars: Episode I – The Phantom Menace on March 11, 1999.

The official specifications of the codec are not public. For a long time the only way to play back Sorenson Video was to use Apple's QuickTime or MPlayer, which used DLL files extracted from QuickTime for Windows.

=== Sorenson Video 3 ===
This incompatible version of Sorenson Video uses SVQ3 as its FourCC.

This version was released with QuickTime 5.0.2 on July 1, 2001. It was available exclusively for QuickTime. Apple QuickTime later focused on other compression formats and moved Sorenson Video 3 to a separate group called "legacy encoders". According to an anonymous developer of FFmpeg, reverse engineering of the SVQ3 codec (Sorenson Video 3) revealed it as a tweaked version of H.264. The same developer added support for this codec to FFmpeg. FFmpeg supports decoding of "Sorenson Vector Quantizer 3" (fourcc SVQ3) and Sorenson Vector Quantizer 1 (fourcc SVQ1) starting with version 0.4.7, released in 2003.

Sorenson Video 3 comes with Sorenson Squeeze.

=== Sorenson Spark ===
Sorenson Spark is an implementation of H.263 for use in Flash Video and Adobe Flash files. FFmpeg uses FLV1 FourCC and Adobe frame identifiers of 0x21, 0x22 and 0x23.

As Apple began to use MPEG-4 and move away from other proprietary codecs, Sorenson Media licensed Sorenson Spark (Sorenson H.263) to Macromedia, which was included with Macromedia Flash MX v6 on March 4, 2002. Sorenson Spark is the required video compression format for Flash Player 6 and 7.

Macromedia later tried to find a better video codec. Starting with Flash Player 8 (released in September 2005), the preferred video codec became VP6. Sorenson Spark can be still used in the Adobe Flash CS4 Professional (2008) for Flash Video files (alongside H.264 and VP6). According to Adobe engineer Tinic Uro, Sorenson Spark is an incomplete implementation of H.263. It differs mostly in header structure and ranges of the coefficients.

FFmpeg in 2003 added encoding and decoding support for Sorenson H.263.

== See also ==
- Videophone
