= Red5 (media server) =

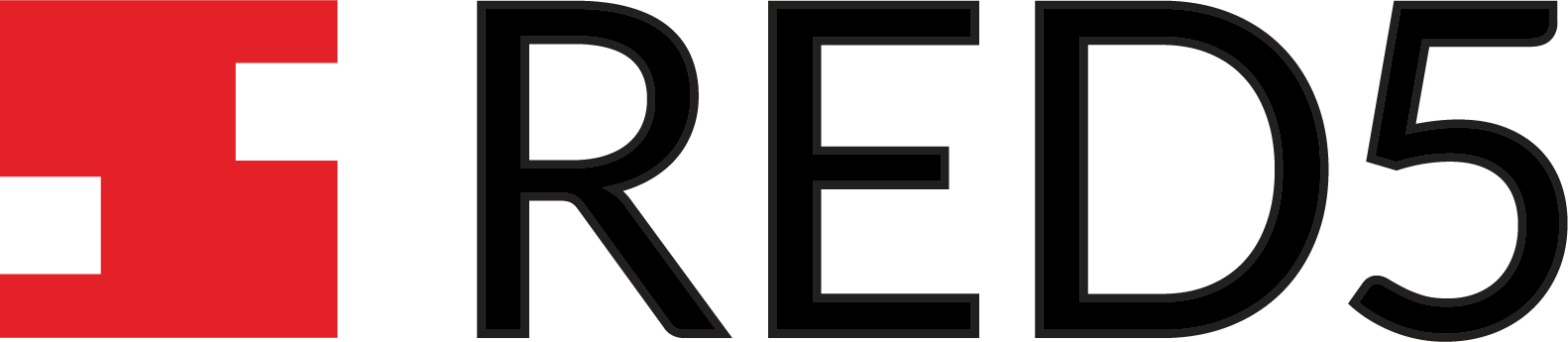
- Stable release: 2.0.24 / 27 November 2025; 51 days ago
- Repository: github.com/Red5/red5-server
- Written in: Java
- Operating system: Cross-platform
- Type: Media server
- License: Apache License 2.0
- Website: www.red5.net

Red5 is a free software media streaming server implemented in Java, which provides services similar to those offered by the proprietary Adobe Flash Media Server and Wowza Streaming Engine including:

- Streaming Video (FLV, F4V, MP4, 3GP)
- Streaming Audio (MP3, F4A, M4A, AAC)
- Recording Client Streams (FLV and AVC+AAC in FLV container)
- Shared Objects
- Live Stream Video Publishing (FLV, VP6)
- Live Stream Audio Publishing (MP3, AAC)
- Remoting (Action Message Format)
- Protocols: RTMP, RTMPT, RTMPS, and RTMPE

The Red5 Project originated in the early 2000s with a mission to provide an open-source real time streaming alternative to Adobe’s proprietary Real-Time Messaging Protocol (RTMP). A group of innovative developers set out to reverse-engineer RTMP, enabling wider access to streaming technology and fostering innovation in the field. In September 2005, the Red5 team successfully reverse-engineered RTMP, marking Red5 as the first open-source project to achieve this milestone . This breakthrough allowed developers to integrate RTMP streaming capabilities into their applications without relying on proprietary software. The open-source community quickly adopted Red5, contributing to its development and expanding its functionality for various multimedia and streaming applications. The project is maintained at GitHub as of 2008, and is available under the Apache License (version 2.0)

In response to growing demands for more robust and scalable streaming solutions, the original Red5 team launched Red5 Pro in 2014. Red5 Pro built upon the foundation of the open-source project, introducing advanced features such as ultra-low latency, dynamic scalability, and WebRTC support. These enhancements positioned Red5 Pro as a leading solution for real-time, interactive streaming experiences across multiple devices and platforms.

== History ==
- Project Started September 2005
- Version 0.8.0 Released 4 June 2009
- Version 1.0.0 Released 3 December 2012
- Version 1.0.1 Released 15 January 2013
- Version 1.0.2 Released 13 July 2013
- Version 1.0.3 Released 5 August 2014
- Version 1.0.4 Released 26 December 2014
- Version 1.0.5 Released 7 February 2015
- Version 1.0.6 Released 8 September 2015
- Version 1.0.7 Released 13 May 2016
- Version 1.0.8 Released 23 December 2016
- Version 1.0.9 Released 12 June 2017
- Version 1.0.10 Released 9 February 2019
- Version 1.1.0 Released 22 April 2019
- Version 1.1.1 Released 29 May 2019
- Version 1.2.2 Released 5 September 2019
- Version 1.2.3 Released 14 October 2019
- Version 1.3.33 (current version) Released 12 April 2024

== See also ==
- Comparison Of Streaming Media Systems
