= Adobe Media Server =

Data and media server

- Developer: Adobe Systems
- Stable release: 5.0.16 / February 27, 2020; 5 years ago
- Operating system: Microsoft Windows, Linux
- Type: Enterprise Server
- License: Proprietary commercial software
- Website: www.adobe.com/products/adobe-media-server-family.html

Adobe Media Server (AMS) is a proprietary data and media server from Adobe Systems (originally a Macromedia product). This server works with the Flash Player and HTML5 runtime to create media driven, multiuser RIAs (Rich Internet Applications). The server uses ActionScript 1, an ECMAScript based scripting language, for server-side logic. Prior to version 2, it was known as Flash Communication Server. Prior to version 5, it was known as Flash Media Server. In February 2019, Adobe Systems Incorporated granted Veriskope Inc rights to further develop, resell, and extend distribution of the software product.

== History ==
On March 16, 2002, Macromedia released Flash Player 6. This version included all the functionality for a yet to be released server called Flash Communication Server MX.

Version 1.0 was released on 9 July 2002 and included all the basic features that make up the product, including the NetConnection, SharedObject and NetStream objects.

Version 1.5 was released on 27 March 2003 giving the server HTTP Tunneling, Linux support and a free developer edition.

Version 2.0 was released on November 15, 2005. The server was renamed to Flash Media Server for this build to better illustrate what the server does; however, the version numbers were not reset. Version 2.0 brought support to stream the new video codec in Flash Player 8, On2’s VP6. However the Flash Player (as of version 10.1) can still only encode to the Spark codec. Version 2.0 also introduced edge-origin servers, an optional enterprise architecture that simplifies load balancing. The server side Actionscript runtime also received updates with support for XML, XMLSocket, SOAP and File operations.

Version 3.0 was released on December 4, 2007.

Version 3.5 was released on January 13, 2009. It also includes a free "development" server.

Version 4.0 was released on September 13, 2010 and introduced full 64-bit support, more secure multiprotocol streaming, IP multicast broadcast, multicast fusion, peer-assisted networking, enhanced buffer, absolute timecode, RTMP QoS improvements, simplified player development, faster switching with RTMP Dynamic Streaming and integrated HTTP server.

Version 5.0 was released on October 8, 2012.

In February 2019, Adobe Systems Incorporated granted Veriskope Inc rights to further develop, resell, and extend distribution of the software product.

Version 5.0.16 was released on March 1, 2020 by Veriskope.

== Usage ==
- Video on Demand, streaming video stored on the server to the flash client.
- Real Time Communication, an application which requires collaboration between multiple clients, such as a chat room or multiplayer games.

== Function ==
Adobe Media Server is a hub. Flash/HTML5 video based applications connect to the hub using Real Time Messaging Protocol (RTMP). The server can send and receive data to and from the connected users with live web FLV or HTML5 player installed. Connected clients can make Remote procedure calls (RPC) on the server-side and the server can call methods on specific clients. A SharedObject can be used to synchronize complicated data structures and call remote methods on multiple clients in one go by having clients subscribe to a shared object. Standard ActionScript objects are transported across the NetConnection using the Action Message Format (AMF) which is handled transparently by the server and flash client.

The server also allows users to receive and publish net streams. When viewing a net stream the user can either create their own to view a remotely stored Flash Video HTML5 (FLV) or the server can instantiate a net stream and play a video on it, the latter method means that every user will be at the same point in the video when they subscribe to it as they are all viewing the same stream.

== See also ==
- Helix Universal Server
- Real Time Messaging Protocol
- Red5 Media Server
- Wowza Media Server
