= Helix Universal Server =

Helix Universal Media Server
- Developer: RealNetworks
- Stable release: 15.2.1 / September 16, 2014
- Operating system: Microsoft Windows 2008 (64 bit), Microsoft Windows 2012 (64 bit)Linux RHEL and CentOS versions 5 and 6 (64 bit), Oracle Linux 6, Solaris SPARC 10 (64 bit)
- Type: Carrier and Enterprise Class Server
- License: Proprietary
- Website: http://www.realnetworks.com/products-services/helix.aspx

The Helix Universal Media Server was a product developed by RealNetworks and originates from the first streaming media server originally developed by Progressive Networks in 1994. It supported a variety of streaming media delivery transports including MPEG-DASH (Standards based HTTP streaming) RTMP (flash), RTSP (standard), HTTP Live Streaming (HLS), Microsoft Silverlight and HTTP Progressive Download enabling mobile phone OS (Android, Blackberry, iOS, Symbian, Windows Mobile) and PC OS media client (Flash Media Player, QuickTime, RealPlayer, Windows Media Player) delivery.

Helix Universal Media Server supported multiple streaming media codecs including H.264, MPEG-4, Flash Media, RealMedia, QuickTime, Windows Media and audio codecs including AAC/AAC+, MP4, MP3, WAV, RealAudio. It ingested encoder formats including RTP, MPEG2-TS, RTMP (Flash) and Windows Media Push/Pull MMS.

Development of the product was discontinued in 2014, and licensing ended in October 2014.

== History ==
27 July 2002 - Helix Universal Server version 9 launched - the first universal multi-format streaming server - supporting RealMedia, Windows Media, QuickTime and MPEG-4 from a single streaming media platform operating on Linux, Solaris, HP-UX, Compaq Tru64, FreeBSD, IBM AIX, Windows NT and Windows 2000 OS

16 November 2005 - Helix Universal Server version 11 launched adding mobile support for 3GPP.

13 May 2008 - Helix Universal Server version 12 launched adding Fast Channel Switching for mobile devices.

30 September 2009 - Helix Universal Server version 13 launched as part of Helix Media Delivery Platform. This version added support for HTTP Progressive Download, HTTP iPhone delivery, Server Side Playlists, Advertising insertion, and Live Rate Adaptation for mobile devices.

14 April 2010 - Helix Universal Server version 14 launched supporting universal streaming media delivery transports including RTMP, RTSP, HTTP Live Streaming, Microsoft Silverlight and HTTP Progressive Download enabling mobile phone OS (Android, Blackberry, iPhone OS 3.0, Symbian, Windows Mobile) and PC OS media client (Flash Media Player, QuickTime, RealPlayer, Windows Media Player) delivery. Helix Universal Server continues to support 3GPP, RealMedia, Windows Media, QuickTime and MPEG-4 from a single streaming media platform operating on Linux (RHEL5), Solaris SPARC, Windows 2003 or Windows 2008 Server OS

30 September 2011 - Helix Universal Media Server version 14.2 launched enhancements include 64 bit OS support (Windows 2008, RHEL5 and Solaris SPARC) and Multi-Track streaming capability enabling multi-lingual and multi-camera applications. Helix Multi-Track reduces the amount of encoders and bandwidth required by separating audio and video into individual streams and combining them within the Helix Multi-Track Server. The web application or media player then selects the most appropriate video and audio track related to their chosen language or video camera angle.

14 April 2012 - Helix Universal Media Server version 14.3 launched enhancements include RTMP flash ingest support for H.264, AAC, FLV and MP3 codecs, H.264/AAC live archiving support.

8 November 2012 - Helix Universal Media Server version 15 launched enhancements include the first end-to-end implementation of MPEG-DASH standards support for streaming both MPEG2-TS (Smart TV) and ISO BMFF MP4 (Smartphone, Tablet) for delivery to MPEG-DASH compliant players including the Helix DNA SDK client for Android. Additional enhancements include push to CDN (HLS and RTMP push with Akamai integration), MPEG2-TS ingest, Verimatrix DRM direct VCAS integration, enhanced SLTA - "live loop" channels and increased operating performance (*over 12 Gbit/s of performance and 12,000 connections), enhanced H.264+AAC live archiving API and HLS Time Shift API. New OS support including RHEL Linux 6 and Oracle 6 (64 bit)

12 April 2013 - Helix Universal Media Server version 15.0.2 launched enhancements include BuyDRM (Microsoft PlayReady support), MPEG2-TS multi-bit rate (MPTS) support.

8 October 2013 - Helix Universal Media Server version 15.1.0 launched enhancements include virtual hosting, 15 Mbps streaming, and additional CDN support.

16 September 2014 - Helix Universal Media Server version 15.2.1 launched enhancements include MPEG-DASH, Flash authentication, and HLS version 5 support.

31 October 2014 - Product development and licensing ended.

== Specifications ==
Formats

- 3GPP, 3GPP2, FLV, F4V, MPEG-4, Windows Media, QuickTime, RealMedia, MP3, SMIL

Codecs

- H.263, H.264, AAC, AAC Plus (HE-AAC), AMR-NB, AMR-WB, Various Flash codecs in FLV, VC1

Delivery Protocols

- MPEG-DASH (Dynamic Streaming over HTTP - Standard), RTSP (Standard), RTP, RBS (Helix-to-Helix), RDT (Helix-to-Helix), HTTP, HTTP cloaking, HTTP Live streaming (HLS), HTTP progressive download, RTMP, RTMPT, RTMPS, MMS (Windows Media), MS-WMSP

Media Clients Supported

- Android - Helix DNA SDK including support for MPEG-DASH and HLS with Verimatrix DRM
- PC - Flash Media Player, QuickTime, RealPlayer, SilverLight, Windows Media Player
- Mobile & Tablet devices - Android, Blackberry, iPhone OS 3.0 or later, Symbian, Windows Mobile 5.0 or later
- Set Top Box - Amino, Dune HD, Sysmaster (HLS) tested with HLS
- Smart TVs - Samsung (HLS and MPEG-DASH)

Encoders Supported

- Helix Producer, Helix Mobile Producer and RealProducer - RealNetworks developed encoding software for Multi-bit rate H.264, H.263, 3GPP, MPEG-4 and RealMedia
- Helix Broadcaster appliance - RealNetworks developed live multi-screen video appliance
- DVEO - MPEG2-TS ingest with H.264, AAC codec support
- Teracue - MPEG2-TS ingest with H.264, AAC codec support (note single rate ingest)
- Envivio - RTP based hardware encoders with H.264, H.263 codec support
- Viewcast - MPEG2-TS, RTP, RTMP based hardware encoders with H.264, AAC codec support
- Flash Media Live Encoder - RTMP based encoders with VP6, H.264, MP3, AAC support
- MediaExcel - RTMP based hardware encoders with H.264, AAC codec support
- Digital Rapids - RTP based hardware encoders with H.264, AAC codec support

== Usage ==
- Live streaming of video and audio using Helix Producer, RealProducer or Simulated "Live Loops" using on-demand play-list agent (SLTA) and 3rd party encoders using RTP, RTMP, MPEG2-TS encoding protocols.
- On-demand streaming of video and audio files from a wide range of video and audio codecs including H.264, H.263, RealVideo, Windows Media, Flash, AMR, AAC, MP3
- Multi-lingual and Multi-camera applications supported using Helix Multi-Track technology which combines audio and video from multiple sources and allows individual video and audio track selection from the media player
- Large scalability through Helix to Helix caching and splitting enabling usage in Content Delivery Networks, Enterprise delivery networks and Educational Campus networks

== Architecture ==
Helix Universal Media Server was a component of the Helix Media Delivery Platform and enabled the delivery of live and on-demand video and audio content to a wide range of media clients on smartphone, tablet, PC, STB and Smart TV playback devices. Helix Universal Servers were able to be linked to distribute content to enable large scale streaming across the Internet or Enterprise networks and to ensure fully redundant operation with no single point of failure.

Helix Universal Media Server operated with a wide range of live RTP or RBS (RealNetworks own secure broadcasting protocol) encoders to provide a wide choice of interoperation with 3rd party vendors. RealNetworks developed their own encoders in both appliance and software versions

- Helix Broadcaster - for live video transcoding from a wide range of sources (SDI, IP, DVB, HDMI) to H.264, AAC and other codecs with HLS, DASH, RTMP, RTSP delivery
- RealProducer - for live and on-demand encoding of RealAudio and RealVideo for RealPlayer clients
- Helix Producer - for live and on-demand encoding of H.264, H.263, MPEG4, AAC, AMR and RealAudio, RealVideo for 3GP and MP4 based and RealPlayer clients

== See also ==
- MPEG-DASH
- HTTP Live Streaming
- Real Time Streaming Protocol
- Real Time Messaging Protocol
- RealNetworks
- Helix Community
