= Wowza Streaming Engine =

Streaming media server

- Developer: Wowza
- Stable release: 4.8.28+4, build 20240709173404 / July 10, 2024; 2 years ago
- Operating system: Java-based, platform agnostic: Linux, macOS, Solaris, Unix, Windows
- Type: Media Software Server
- License: Proprietary
- Website: Official website

Wowza Streaming Engine (known as Wowza Media Server prior to version 4) is a unified streaming media server software developed by Wowza. The server is used for streaming of live and on-demand video, audio, and rich Internet applications over IP networks to desktop, laptop, and tablet computers, mobile devices, IPTV set-top boxes, internet-connected TV sets, game consoles, and other network-connected devices. The server is a Java application deployable on most operating systems.

== History ==
Version 1.0.x was released on February 19, 2007. This version was originally offered as an alternative to the Adobe Flash Media Server, and supported streamed video, audio and RIA’s for the Flash Player client playback and interaction based on the Real Time Messaging Protocol (RTMP) using content encoded with Spark and VP6 codecs. The original product name was Wowza Media Server Pro.

Version 1.5.x was released on May 15, 2008 and added support for H.264 video and Advanced Audio Coding (AAC) audio, and ingest support for Real Time Streaming Protocol (RTSP), Real-time Transport Protocol (RTP), MPEG transport stream (MPEG-TS), and ICY (SHOUTcast/Icecast) sources for re-streaming to the Flash Player client.

Version 2.0.x was released on December 17, 2009. The product name was changed to Wowza Media Server 2. This version added outbound H.264 streaming support for Apple HTTP Live Streaming protocol for iOS devices (iPad, iPhone, etc.), Microsoft HTTP Smooth Streaming for Silverlight player, RTSP/RTP for QuickTime Player and mobile devices based on Android, BlackBerry (RIM), Symbian (Symbian Foundation), Palm webOS (now owned by HP), and other platforms, and TV set-top boxes and video game consoles.

Version 3.0.x was released on October 7, 2011. This version added network DVR, Live transcoding, and DRM plug-in functionality.

Version 3.5 was released on November 7, 2012. This version added Closed Captioning and a Silverlight Multicast Player. Live Stream Record and Media Security, previously additional features external to the software, were incorporated into the server software. Media Security DRM plugins with Verimetrix VCAS, Microsoft PlayReady, BuyDRM KeyOS Services, EZDRM Hosted DRM, AuthenTec DRM Fusion. Wowza also released Wowza StreamLock free AddOn which provides 256-bit SSL for RTMPS and HTTPS. The release included enhancements to Wowza Transcoder AddOn; transcoder overlays that can be used for advertising, tilting, watermarks and tickers. Other new features include B-frame support, Dolby Digital Plus (EAC3) pass-through for HLS, MPEG-DASH, HTTP Origin.

Version 3.6 was released June 10, 2013. Wowza Media Server 3.6 added basic support for Dynamic Adaptive Streaming over HTTP (DASH). Expanded support for closed captioning formats for live and video-on-demand streams.

Version 4.0 was released February 11, 2014. The product name was changed to Wowza Streaming Engine. This release includes a new web-based graphical interface which interacts with the server via a REST API and provides monitoring and configuration functions. This release also brings full support for MPEG-DASH and support for additional for captioning formats. Previously available separately, the MediaCache and Push Publishing add-on modules are now included in the server.

Version 4.2 was released on June 16, 2015. This release included the Stream Targets feature in Wowza Streaming Engine Manager, enabling you to send an incoming live source stream to one or more destinations that re-distribute the source stream to users. Stream target destinations allow you to scale and add redundancy to your live streaming workflow.

Version 4.3 was released on October 6, 2015. New functionality included full access to the Wowza Streaming Engine REST API. You can use the REST API to configure, manage, and monitor the media server through HTTP requests.

Version 4.7.3 was released on November 14, 2017. Wowza Streaming Engine 4.7.3 software added support for Secure Reliable Transport (SRT) in Wowza Streaming Engine media servers on Linux and Windows operating systems. Wowza Streaming Engine 4.7.3 also introduced the ability to create a generic stream target that sends an SRT stream from Wowza Streaming Engine to destinations such as content delivery networks (CDNs) and streaming services for distributed delivery.

Version 4.7.6 was released on July 31, 2018. New functionality included support for MPEG-DASH with nDVR. The Wowza nDVR feature enables you to record a live stream with Wowza Streaming Engine while simultaneously allowing users to play or pause the live stream, rewind it to a previously recorded point, or resume viewing at the current live point.

Version 4.7.7 was released on November 13, 2018. Wowza Streaming Engine 4.7.7 added support for WebRTC. Wowza Streaming Engine can ingest source WebRTC audio and video content and deliver it to supporting players. It can also transmux or transcode WebRTC to other streaming protocols, including Apple HLS, Adobe HDS, RTMP, RTSP, and Microsoft Smooth Streaming.

Version 4.7.8 was released November 5, 2019. Added functionality included support for Low-Latency HLS. Wowza Streaming Engine can now generate Low-Latency HLS live streams. Wowza Streaming Engine now also supports Common Media Application Format (CMAF), the open, extensible standard that enables efficient streaming using the HLS and MPEG-DASH protocols.

Version 4.8 was released February 18, 2020. The update added full support for WebRTC and Secure Reliable Transport (SRT) streaming; the addition of the CMAF packetizer for MPEG-DASH, HLS, and Low-Latency HLS streaming; and added support for recording MPEG-DASH live streams with the nDVR feature.

Version 4.8.5 was released June 17, 2020. Extensive updates were added related to WebRTC including improved accuracy of RTCP feedback messages for adaptive encoding. There is now support for SRT version 1.4 and EXT-X-PRELOAD-HINT media playlist tag for Low Latency HLS. The new version also increased security.

== Formats ==
Wowza Streaming Engine can stream to multiple types of playback clients and devices simultaneously, including the Adobe Flash player, Microsoft Silverlight player, Apple QuickTime Player and iOS devices (iPad, iPhone, iPod Touch), mobile phones, IPTV set-top boxes (Amino, Apple TV, Enseo, Fire TV, Roku, Streamit and others), and game consoles such as Wii, Xbox, and PS4.

Wowza Streaming Engine is compatible with standard streaming protocols. On the playout side, these include RTMP (and the variants RTMPS, RTMPT, RTMPE, RTMPTE), HDS, HLS, MPEG-DASH, WebRTC, RTSP, Smooth Streaming, and MPEG-TS (unicast and multicast). On the live ingest side the server can ingest video and audio via RTP, RTSP, RTMP, MPEG-TS (unicast and multicast), ICY (SHOUTcast / Icecast) and WebRTC streams.

In 2017 Wowza and Haivision created SRT Alliance to develop and promote an open-source SRT protocol for low latency reliable-UDP delivery.

For on-demand streaming, Wowza Streaming Engine can ingest multiple types of audio and video files. Supported file types include MP4 (QuickTime container - .mp4, .f4v, .mov, .m4a, .m4v, .mp4a, .mp4v, .3gp, and .3g2), FLV (Flash Video - .flv), and MP3 content (.mp3).

== See also ==
- MPEG-DASH
