= Windows Media Connect =

Windows Media Connect (WMC) is a discontinued UPnP AV server from Microsoft for Windows XP and later Windows operating systems, to share and stream media on a Windows computer to Windows Media Connect clients. The first two releases of WMC were made available as stand-alone software, and included a client as well. Following that, it was renamed to Home Media Ecosystem (HME) and the media server component was integrated into Windows Media Player and Windows Home Server. WMC version 2.0 can be manually installed on Windows Server 2008 or Windows Server 2008 R2 32bit or 64bit operating system but this type of installation is not officially supported by Microsoft and requires manual tweaking of NT Services' dependencies in order to run. Versions 3 and 4 were completely integrated into Windows Media Player 11, and these versions were not available separately. Windows Media Player itself was discontinued and replaced by the modern Media Player app, which does not contain UPnP AV server functionality.

== Version history ==
WMC 1.0 was originally released as an out-of-band update to Windows XP, which could stream only Windows Media files. Version 2.0 added support for UNC paths and removable devices as well as enhanced support for media formats, including ASF. Future versions were not released as stand-alone applications, but integrated into Windows Media Player, where it powers the Network Sharing Service feature. WMP 11 in Windows XP contains WMC 3.0, and in Windows Vista it contains WMC 4.0; the Windows Vista version of WMP 11 includes a WMC client as well. While WMC 3.0 and WMC 4.0 offer similar feature-set, they are built using different codebases. With WMP integration, WMC can make available the entire media library managed by WMP. When a shared library is browsed by the WMP client, it can be browsed, filtered and sorted like a regular WMP media library. On Windows XP by default, Windows Media Connect 2.0 does not work after Windows Media Player 11 has been installed, although Windows Media Player 11 only includes the UPnP AV server and does not include the client.

== Overview ==
WMC is a UPnP AV server that can make media files stored on a computer available to UPnP AV-compatible digital media receiver clients over a local area network. WMC advertises itself to the clients, so there is no need to manually configure the client to connect to the WMC server. Multiple WMC instances can run at a time, all will be accessible to a client. Any UPnP AV client can be used to access WMC shared media. The client can query WMC for the list of files shared, the result of the query is formatted using XML. Once it chooses from the list the media to be played, the media file is streamed to the client for playing. Pictures are streamed using HTTP, different protocols are used for music and video. A client supporting the UPnP Media Renderer standard will be able to render the stream.

While any UPnP AV client can act as a client, using a dedicated WMC client, like the Xbox 360 and PlayStation 3, Zune music player, WMP 11 in Windows Vista or the WMC standalone client (available as part of WMC 2.0) can give an enhanced experience. The query results for the list of media contain certain metadata about the files as well, including media type, dates, rating, keywords for artist, albums etc. It also contains shared playlists. A WMC client uses these metadata to present the media items categorically for browsing. The top-level menu in a WMC client has containers for Audio, Video, Pictures and Playlists, and sub-menus further categorize the media. Client-side playlists can be created out of these shared files as well. When the WMC 11 client is used to access a library shared by WMC 3.0 or WMC 4.0, it lists the media files as a Shared Library using the same library view it uses to organize local media files, complete with album art and thumbnails.

== See also ==
- Windows Media Center
- Windows Media Player
