= DVD player (disambiguation) =

DVD player can refer to these following concepts that embrace DVD playback:

- DVD player (device)
- DVD player software – media player software for playing DVDs, such as:
  - DVD Player (Windows)
  - DVD Player (Mac OS)
- DVD drive

== See also ==
- CD player (precursor to the DVD player, with similarly shaped discs)
- Blu-ray player (not to be confused with HD DVD, since both standards employ HD video provisions)
