= Music player =

Music player can refer to:

- Various types of musicians: bass player, guitar player, piano player, etc.
- Music box
- Player piano
- Record player
- Tape player
- Media player software, software running on a computer that can play various types of media, including audio
- Portable media player, hardware device for playing back music
