= Tek-Tools Software =

- Type: Private
- Industry: IT Infrastructure Management Software Solutions
- Founded: United States (1996)
- Headquarters: Dallas, USA
- Key people: Ken Barth (CEO & President)
- Products: Virtual Profiler; Storage Profiler; Backup Profiler; Server Profiler; Application Profiler vProfiler

Tek-Tools Software was an IT infrastructure management software company founded in 1996 and acquired by SolarWinds in 2010. Its Headquarters were in Dallas, Texas.

Tek-Tools' original claim to fame was the Java IDE (Integrated Development Environment) called Kawa. Kawa was acquired by Allaire Corporation in 2000, and much of the team went with it.

Tek-Tools continued into the storage/backup market. The company’s Profiler Suite grew from a traditional server-based Storage Resource Management (SRM) application into an IT framework that was recognized by Gartner as a Challenger in the SRM Magic Quadrant.

Profiler customers included a wide range of organizations within the private and public sectors and industries such as finance, health care, insurance, manufacturing, utilities, telecommunications, education, transport, internet service providers, and real estate.

The Profiler Suite consists of: Virtual Profiler, Storage Profiler, Backup Profiler, App Profiler and Server Profiler. vProfiler is a virtualization management software for early stage virtualization environments.

In January 2010, Tek-Tools was acquired by SolarWinds for $42 million. SolarWinds President and CEO Michael Bennett said that the acquisition would enable SolarWinds to offer a broader product set to their customers. A number of the Tek-Tools' alumni moved on to found Symphonic Source Inc. in June 2010.
