= CD Player (Windows) =

Program in Windows 95 to Windows 2000

- CD Player running in Windows 98 with no disc inserted
- Developer: Microsoft
- Initial release: August 13, 1993; 32 years ago
- Operating system: Microsoft Windows
- Successor: Windows Media Player
- Type: Media player
- License: Proprietary software

CD Player is a computer program that plays audio CDs using the computer's sound card. It was included in Windows 95, Windows 98, Windows NT 3.1, Windows NT 3.5, Windows NT 3.51, Windows NT 4.0 and Windows 2000 (as Deluxe CD Player). It was removed from Windows ME and beyond in favor of "CD/DVD playback functionality" in Windows Media Player.

== Features ==
When the CD Player is launched, it searches the computer's optical disc drive for CD audio tracks, looks up disc metadata with an Internet service and plays the CD. If no CD is inserted, one of the following error messages is returned by the program: Data or no disc loaded. or Please insert an audio compact disc.

CD Player's time display can be toggled between Track Time Elapsed, Track Time Remaining, and Disc Time Remaining. Tracks can be played in sequence or in random order. CD recognition, track and artist data can be manually entered and are re-displayed on next load. The database information is stored in a cdplayer.ini file which is limited to 64 kilobytes.

== Deluxe CD Player ==
A modified version of CD Player with a different skin called Deluxe CD Player was also included in Microsoft Plus! for Windows 98, Windows 2000, Windows ME until "beta 3" stage and Windows XP (Whistler) until beta 2 build 2446.

As a feature upgrade to the standard CD Player, Deluxe CD Player was able to retrieve album metadata from the now defunct Tunes.com and Music Boulevard. The database information is stored in a DeluxeCD.mdb file, a Microsoft Access file format.
