= NetShow =

Internet network broadcasting framework

NetShow was Microsoft's original framework for Internet network broadcasting, intended to compete with RealNetworks RealMedia & Vivo (acquired in 1998 by RealNetworks). It was later renamed and marketed under the Windows Media umbrella.

NetShow 1.0 came out in 1996. A newer version, 2.0, was included in Windows NT 4.0 SP3 in 1997. Version 3.0 came out mid-1998. The whole product line was renamed Windows Media in October, 1999, four months before Windows 2000 appeared.

The NetShow name is still carried on in the user-agent string in current versions of Windows Media Player, which reports as "NSPlayer".

== Components ==
NetShow Player 2.0 running in Windows XP

- NetShow Player (version 2.0 was included with Internet Explorer 4 March 10 1997, now incorporated into Windows Media Player)
- NetShow Services (renamed Windows Media Services) It was eventually incorporated into the media server functionality of Microsoft Internet Information Services (IIS). Netshow server and encoder functionality was also integrated into PowerPoint as part of the Online Broadcast functionality in Microsoft Windows 95.
- NetShow Encoder (renamed Windows Media Encoder)
- NetShow Real-Time Encoder
- ASF Editor
- NetShow Presenter
- VIDTOASF
- WAVTOASF
- ASFCHOP
- NetShow Channel (renamed Windows Media Station)
- NetShow Server (also known as Theater Server): A high bitrate, full frame, on-demand streaming media solution for closed-circuit networks (such as airplanes or hotels).

== Related technologies ==
- Active Streaming Format (ASF) (later renamed Advanced Streaming Format, then to Advanced Systems Format)
- Microsoft Media Server (MMS)
