= Windows Media Player (2022) =

Video and audio player developed by Microsoft for Windows 11 and Windows 10

Media Player

- Media Player running on Windows 11 in Light mode
- Developer: Microsoft
- Release: November 16, 2021; 4 years ago
- Stable release: July 2026 Update (11.2607.16) (August 28, 2026; 2 days ago) [±]
- Operating system: Windows 10, 11
- Platform: IA-32 (Windows 10 only), x86-64, AArch64
- Predecessor: Groove Music; Microsoft Movies & TV; Windows Media Player

Media Player (also known as the previous name, Windows Media Player in the Microsoft Store) is a media player software for Windows, developed by Microsoft. Written in Windows App SDK, it is built upon Groove Music to add video playback. It is a modern replacement of the original Windows Media Player designed for a newer era. It was first released in January 2022, built for Windows 11 and later released to Windows 10 in January 2023, replacing several separate apps.

== History ==
A new Media Player from Microsoft was first leaked in September 2021, a few days before the retail release of Windows 11. It was eventually released on November 16, 2021, to Windows 11 Insider (testing) channels, with Windows 11 initially shipping without the new Media Player. Eventually it started rolling out to all Windows 11 users as a software update in January 2022.

Media Player is the successor to Groove Music (previously Xbox Music), Microsoft Movies & TV, and the original Windows Media Player. Unlike the first two, Media Player is a straightforward player for local content and not tied in with an online media service.

The new Media Player was later released to Windows 10 users in January 2023 and replaced Groove Music through an update.

== Features ==
Media Player, a UWP app built on Groove Music, adds support for video files, as part of Groove Music's rebranding from a music streaming service to a media player. Other changes to the app include the album cover view being in fullscreen, and a refresh to the mini player. Accessibility has also been optimized in this new version, with some improved keyboard shortcuts and hotkey support for keyboard users and with other assistive technologies.

Some features from the original Windows Media Player were initially not included, such as DLNA local streaming and the ripping of CDs. Ripping was eventually reintroduced in July 2022 for Windows 11, supporting the AAC, WMA, FLAC, and ALAC formats.

== Supported formats ==
This is a list of known supported formats in Media Player on Windows 10 and Windows 11. It generally supports every Media Foundation codec out-of-the-box or installed app via Microsoft Store.

List of supported audio formats
File Container	File Extension	Number of channels
MPEG-1 Audio Layer III; MPEG-2 Audio Layer III	.mp3	2
Free Lossless Audio Codec	.flac	2
Raw AAC stream Audio Data Interchange Format (ADIF); Audio Data Transport Stream (ADTS)	.aac, .adt, .adts	2
MPEG-4 audio-only file (AAC)	.m4a, .m4r	5.1
Waveform Audio File Format	.wav	2
Windows Media Audio	.wma	5.1
Dolby AC-3	.ac3	5.1
Enhanced Audio Codec 3	.ec3	15
3GP and 3G2	.3gp, .3g2	2
Adaptive Multi-Rate	.amr	2
CD-Audio track	.cda	2
Matroska audio-only file	.mka	2
Music Module file	.mod	4
MPEG-2 audio file	.mpa	2
Ogg audio-only file (may contain various Xiph formats such as: Ogg FLAC, OggPCM, Ogg Vorbis, Ogg Opus)	.oga	2
Ogg container (Vorbis)	.ogg	2
Ogg container (Opus)	.opus	2
Dolby AC-4	.ac4	7.1.4
DTS Audio	.dts	5.1 and more

List of supported video formats
File Container	File Extension	Notes
MPEG-4 video Apple MPEG-4 video (MPEG-4 Part 2, H.264, H.265, AV1)	.mp4, .m4v, .mp4v	Dolby Vision, H.265, and AV1 playback require installation of an add-on from Microsoft Store. DTS Audio playback requires DTS Sound Unbound from Microsoft Store with a DTS:X Decoder license.
QuickTime File Format	.mov	
Advanced Systems Format	.asf	
Audio Video Interleave	.avi	
Windows Media Video	.wmv	
BDAV MPEG-2 Transport Stream	.m2ts, .m2t, .mts	
MPEG-1 or MPEG-2 video file	.mpeg, .mpg, .mpe, .mp2, .mp2v, .m1v, .m2v, .ts	Requires installation of the MPEG-2 add-one from the Microsoft Store.
JVC Everio Video Capture File	.tod	
3GP and 3G2	.3g2, .3gp, .3gp2, .3gpp	
Matroska video	.mkv	
WebM (VP8, VP9, AV1)	.webm	AV1 playback requires installation of add-on from the Microsoft Store.
Ogg container (Theora)	.ogv	
Ogg media file	.ogm	
DivX video file	.divx	
Xvid video file	.xvid	

List of supported streaming protocols
Streaming Protocol	URL Identifier
Shoutcast / Icecast (ICY)	—
HTTP Live Streaming (HLS)	.m3u8
