= Flip4Mac =

Digital media software

- Developers: Telestream, Inc.
- Release: December 6, 2004; 21 years ago
- Final release: 3.3.7.2 / October 5, 2015; 10 years ago
- Operating system: macOS
- Platform: x86, x64
- Available in: English
- Type: Multimedia framework, plug-in, media player
- License: Proprietary commercial software
- Website: www.telestream.net/flip4mac/overview.htm

Flip4Mac from Telestream, Inc. was a digital media software for the macOS operating system. It was known for being the only QuickTime component for macOS to support Windows Media Video, and was distributed by Microsoft as a substitute after they discontinued their media player for Macintosh computers.

== Features ==
Telestream previously offered a free standalone player also known as Flip Player while charging for their Pro and Studio features until the release of v3.3 on May 1, 2014, when they began charging for Flip4Mac Player (plug-in and standalone player combined).

There are four versions of Flip4Mac Player:

- Flip4Mac Player ($9.99)

Play Windows Media files (.wma and .wmv) directly in QuickTime applications and view Windows Media content on the Internet using a web browser

- Flip4Mac Player Pro ($29)

Adds the ability to import WMV and WMA files for editing and conversion to QuickTime formats or iOS devices

- Flip4Mac Studio ($49)

Includes all the features of Player Pro, and adds the ability to create standard definition (up to 768 x 576) WMV files using preset templates and custom encoding profiles

- Flip4Mac Studio Pro HD ($179)

Includes all the features of Studio, and adds two-pass HD (up to 1920 x 1080), VBR encoding and pro audio features

== Technical specifications ==
Below is the following technical specifications for Flip4Mac Player:

Codec support

| Supported audio codecs | Play and import | Export |
|---|---|---|
| Windows Media Audio 9 Professional | ✓ | ✓* |
| Windows Media Audio 9 Lossless | ✓ | ✓* |
| Windows Media Audio 9 Standard | ✓ | ✓ |
| Windows Media Audio 7/8 | ✓ | |
| Microsoft G.726 | ✓ | |
| Microsoft IMA ADPCM | ✓ | |
| Microsoft ADPCM | ✓ | |
| Supported video codecs | Play and import | Export |
| Windows Media Video 9 Advanced (WMVA) — Broadcast Profile | ✓ | ✓* |
| Windows Video Codec 1 (WVC1) | ✓ | |
| Windows Media Video 9 Standard (WMV3) | ✓ | ✓ |
| Windows Media Video 8 (WMV2) | ✓ | |
| Windows Media Video 7 (WMV1) | ✓ | |
| ISO MPEG-4 V1.1 (M4S2) | ✓ | |
| ISO MPEG-4 V1.0 (MP4S) | ✓ | |
| Microsoft MPEG-4 V3 (MP43) | ✓ | |
| Microsoft MPEG-4 V2 (MP42) | ✓ | |
| Microsoft Motion JPEG (MJPG) | ✓ | |
| Supported file formats | Play and import | Export |
| Advanced Systems Format (ASF) | ✓ | ✓ |
| Advanced Stream Redirector (ASX) | ✓ | |
| Audio/Video Interleaved (AVI) — WMV media wrapped in AVI file format | ✓ | |

*NOTE: Exporting WMV9 Advanced and WMA Professional and Lossless is supported only by Flip4Mac Studio Pro HD

Network stream protocols

| Stream type | Name | Protocols |
|---|---|---|
| MMS | Microsoft Media Server | MMS, HTTP, RTSP, and TCP |
| HLS | HTTP Live Streaming | HTTP and TCP |

Frame sizes available for export

| 4:3 | Studio | Studio Pro HD |
|---|---|---|
| 160 x 120 | ✓ | ✓ |
| 240 x 180 | ✓ | ✓ |
| 320 x 240 | ✓ | ✓ |
| 384 x 288 | ✓ | ✓ |
| 480 x 360 | ✓ | ✓ |
| 640 x 480 | ✓ | ✓ |
| 768 x 576 | ✓ | ✓ |
| 960 x 720 | | ✓ |
| 1280 x 1080 | | ✓ |
| 4:3 CCIR | Studio | Studio Pro HD |
| 720 x 480 | | ✓ |
| 720 x 575 | | ✓ |
| 16:9 | Studio | Studio Pro HD |
| 320 x 180 | ✓ | ✓ |
| 640 x 360 | ✓ | ✓ |
| 960 x 540 | | ✓ |
| 1280 x 720 | | ✓ |
| 1920 x 1080 | | ✓ |

== System requirements ==
In order to run Flip4Mac, you need to meet the following specifications:

- Intel-based Mac
- Mac OS X Snow Leopard or later

*NOTE: Please note if running on Snow Leopard, you need to update to 10.6.8 via Apple Software Update.

== Windows Media Components for QuickTime ==
Windows Media Components for QuickTime allow free transparent playback of the most common Windows Media Video and Windows Media Audio formats on macOS inside QuickTime applications and web browsers.

On January 12, 2006, Microsoft discontinued the Macintosh version of Windows Media Player and began distributing Flip4Mac Player for free until May 1, 2014, when Telestream began charging for Flip4Mac Player. Microsoft's website refers the product as Windows Media Components for QuickTime while Telestream just refers to Flip4Mac.

By 2024 Telestream rebranded Flip4Mac to Switch Player.

== Windows Media ==
=== Advanced Stream Redirector ===
Advanced Stream Redirector (ASX) file format is a type of Extensible Markup Language (XML) metafile designed to store a playlist of Windows Media files for a multimedia presentation. Flip4Mac currently supports the following MIME types:

| video/x-ms-wmv | audio/x-ms-wma |
| video/x-ms-wm | video/x-ms-asf |
| video/x-ms-wvx | video/x-ms-wmx |
| audio/x-ms-wax | video/x-ms-asx |

=== Advanced Systems Format ===
Advanced Systems Format (ASF) is Microsoft's proprietary digital audio/digital video container format, especially meant for streaming media.

=== Windows Media Audio ===
Windows Media Audio (WMA) is an audio data compression technology developed by Microsoft. The name can be used to refer to its audio file format or its audio codecs.

=== Windows Media Digital Rights Management ===
Flip4Mac is unable to play content that has been protected using digital rights management.

=== Windows Media Video ===
Windows Media Video (WMV) is a video data compression technology developed by Microsoft.

== Version history ==
- Flip4Mac 2.1 was released in July 2006 with support for Intel-based Macs.
- Flip4Mac 3.0 was released in September 2012 with support for 64-bit improvements as well as Gatekeeper. It also includes Flip Player, a new multi-format video player with the ability to play the most common Windows Media formats.
- Flip4Mac 3.1 was released in February 2013 with support for the third generation MacBook Pros, MacBooks (relaunched version of the original MacBook line), and iMacs with Retina display. It also includes the ability to export videos to iTunes from Flip Player.
- Flip4Mac 3.2 was released in May 2013 with support for dramatically improved load time for ASF (.wmv, .wma, .wm, .wmp, .asf, etc.) file formats.
- Flip4Mac 3.3 was released in May 2014 with several minor 3.3.X updates with 3.3.8.1 being the latest update. Several updates include re-supporting Mac OS X Snow Leopard (after the support being removed in 3.0), and natively supporting OS X Yosemite (10.10) and OS X El Capitan (10.11).
- The software is no longer supported higher than OS X El Capitan (10.11). As a replacement Telestream advises users to try their Switch4Player software.

== See also ==
- Perian
