= Xbox Games Store =

Digital distribution platform

- Developer: Microsoft
- Type: Digital distribution
- Launched: November 22, 2005 (Xbox 360); November 22, 2013 (Xbox One)
- Discontinued: October 22, 2017 (Xbox One); July 29, 2024 (Xbox 360)
- Platforms: Xbox 360; Xbox One
- Status: Defunct (Xbox 360); Merged into Microsoft Store (Xbox One)
- Website: Xbox 360 Marketplace (Archived)

Xbox Games Store (formerly Xbox LIVE Marketplace) was a digital distribution platform previously used by Microsoft's Xbox 360 and formerly by the Xbox One. The service allowed users to download or purchase video games (including both Xbox LIVE Arcade games and full Xbox 360 titles), add-ons for existing games, game demos along with other miscellaneous content such as gamer pictures and Dashboard themes.

Xbox Live Marketplace launched alongside the Xbox 360 on November 22, 2005, with 400 pieces of content. It was rebranded to Xbox Games Store on August 30, 2013 to prepare for the then upcoming launch of the Xbox One.

Xbox Games Store was replaced on October 22, 2017 by Microsoft Store as the standard digital storefront for all Windows 10 devices. The subsequent Xbox Series X/S consoles also use Microsoft Store.

The service also previously offered sections for downloading video content, such as films and television episodes; as of late 2012, this functionality was superseded by Xbox Music and Xbox Video (now known as Groove Music and Microsoft Movies & TV respectively).

As announced by Microsoft on August 17, 2023, the Xbox Games Store for the Xbox 360 was shut down on July 29, 2024; however, following its termination, backwards-compatible Xbox 360 titles remain available for purchase on the Microsoft Store for Xbox One and Xbox Series X/S.

== Services ==
=== Xbox Live Arcade ===
The Xbox Live Arcade (XBLA) branding encompassed smaller, digital-only games that were only available through the Xbox Games Store, including ports of classic games and new original titles.

=== Games on Demand ===
The Games on Demand section of Xbox Games Store allowed users to purchase downloadable versions of retail Xbox 360 titles, along with games released for the original Xbox. The service would later be brought to PC with Games for Windows Games on Demand.

=== Xbox Live Indie Games ===
As part of the "New Xbox Experience" update launched on November 19, 2008, Microsoft launched Xbox Live Community Games (later renamed to Xbox Live Indie Games), a service similar to Xbox Live Arcade, with smaller and less expensive games created by independent developers and small studios using the XNA framework. Such games were added to the service after successfully passing through a peer review system that prevents inappropriate content from appearing in games and ensures that games meet certain technical standards and do not misrepresent their content.

=== Video Marketplace ===
The Xbox Games Store also formerly featured a Video Marketplace alongside the other services that allowed for the distribution of movies and TV shows in both standard and high definition. Initially, while TV shows could be downloaded and saved, films could only be rented, expiring 24 hours after initial viewing or 14 days after purchase. Content partners that were signed up to the service at launch included Paramount Pictures, CBS, TBS, MTV Networks, UFC, NBC, and Warner Bros. Home Entertainment. Other movie studios have since supported the service including Lionsgate Films and Walt Disney Pictures as announced at E3 2007. At CES 2008, MGM, ABC, the Disney Channel and Toon Disney announced their support for the service.

At launch, the Video Marketplace encountered widespread problems such as lengthy download times, duplicate billing for the same content, and downloads that could not complete, or for which users would have had to repay to complete.

On March 6, 2007, the South Park episode "Good Times with Weapons" was available for free download; this episode was free only in the high definition version until April 3, 2007, however. Starting on March 13, 2007, all episodes from South Park's 11th season were offered uncensored. Also, starting on July 26, 2007, the pilot episode of Jericho was available for download free of charge for both the standard and high definition versions.

In late 2009, the Video Marketplace was replaced by the Zune Video Marketplace, and later accompanied by a Zune Music Marketplace. Both Zune Marketplaces were replaced by the new Xbox Music and Xbox Video services in late 2012.

== Criticism ==
Most complaints and criticisms leveled at the Xbox Live service concerned the Xbox Live Marketplace:

=== Problems with replacement consoles ===
Per Marketplace design, the digital rights management license for downloaded content is tied to both a specific user and to a specific console. This means that to access the content, the user either needs to be signed on to Xbox Live using their Gamertag, or be playing on the original console the content was purchased on.

As a result, users with replacement consoles cannot use previously downloaded content without being connected to Xbox Live. This has the effect of restricting usage of purchased content when no Internet connection is available. An additional wrinkle is added when there are multiple accounts on one console. In this case, all accounts can normally share content when it was downloaded on that system. However, if the system is replaced, then only the actual Xbox Live account to which the content is tied can make use of it (a workaround exists whereby the non-purchasing gamertag can use the content, but only if the original purchasing gamertag is signed into Xbox Live as a secondary profile).

Microsoft's original attempts to resolve these issues were limited to transferring licenses to consoles replaced under warranty. This required contacting Microsoft support, and the console must have been replaced through Microsoft itself or a warranty from the retailer where it was originally purchased. License transfers could not be performed in the case of a voluntary upgrade (e.g., if the user purchased a newer Xbox 360 replace their old console).

As of June 2008, Microsoft has released an online tool that allows users to transfer licenses from the console where they were originally purchased to another. This is done in a two-step process, where all licenses are first migrated on the server side, and then downloaded onto the new console. To prevent abuse, this process can only be performed every four months. Licenses remain bound to the Gamertag regardless, so users who store their profiles on portable memory units can continue to use purchased content on any console when signed into the service.

=== Pricing ===
Price consistency and whether some content should be available free of charge has also been a source of criticism related to the Xbox Live Marketplace. A notable incident was Microsoft charging for a Gears of War map pack that developer Epic desired to provide at no cost (although it was made free four months later in September 2007). Exacerbating the controversy, Game Informer made claims that Microsoft forced companies to charge for content the company itself wanted to distribute free. In this case, Microsoft Publishing was responsible for setting the price, with this not actually being a policy of the Xbox team or Xbox Live Marketplace as was implied. Free content is indeed possible, but much of the free content is promotional in nature, such as the titles Yaris and Dash of Destruction.

The Microsoft Points system previously required to purchase content was criticized for being deceptive in terms of actual real-world cost, as well as for users often having to purchase more points at once than are immediately needed (in North America, users could only purchase points in increments of 400, costing around $5). In June 2013, Microsoft announced the discontinuation of points in favor of credit using local currencies, which took effect in an Xbox 360 software update released on August 26, 2013.

=== Regional lockouts ===
After the Spring 2007 dashboard update, Microsoft increased the security on the regional content restrictions. This made obtaining entertainment content for international markets impossible, while the US market has a substantial offering in comparison. Even some free content, such as downloadable extras for retail games, is impossible to obtain in certain regions, despite there being no legal or censorship problems (an example of this would be the second Gears of War map pack; while the first pack was initially available free worldwide, the Spring 2007 update made both unavailable to many Xbox 360 owners).

In the case of New Zealand, all child accounts were banned from downloading any marketplace content in mid-June. As of October 15, 2010 these are still locked from downloading anything apart from software updates and user-created content, no matter what the rating.

== Xbox gift card scam ==
Besides using direct funds to purchase items from the Xbox Games Store, Microsoft offered Xbox gift cards that could be purchased at retail outlets or included in game packages. These cards included a 25 alpha-numeric code that could be redeemed via the Xbox or on the web for specific content or towards Xbox Points to be used for purchase on the store.

In 2017, Volodymyr Kvashuk was hired at a contractor within Microsoft. He was part of a team to test Microsoft's e-commerce websites which included the purchasing of Xbox gift cards. Kvashuk found that in the test scenarios, he was being given legitimate Xbox gift card codes. He began quietly collecting codes and later sold these to others. By the time he was caught by federal agents, he had obtained over $10 million in value of Xbox gift cards and sold these at about half their value for Bitcoin, from which he purchased an expensive house and car. Microsoft had discovered the large use of these gift cards and eventually traced it to an internal source, leading them and federal agents to Kvashuk, who was convicted and found guilty on 18 felonies in 2020.

== See also ==
- Groove Music
- Microsoft Movies & TV
- Xbox (app)
- Xbox network
- Windows Phone Store
- Microsoft Store
