= Storage allocation =

In computing, storage allocation may refer to:

- Memory management
- Register allocation
- Storage Resource Management
