= Bridgehead (disambiguation) =

A bridgehead is a military fortification that protects the end of a bridge that is closest to the enemy.

Bridgehead may also refer to:

- Bridgehead Coffee, a Canadian coffeehouse business
- Bridgehead atoms, found in bicyclic molecules
- BridgeHead Software, a software company
