= Windows Media Services =

Streaming software

Windows Media Services (WMS) is streaming media server software that allows a Windows Server administrator to generate streaming media (audio/video). Only Windows Media, JPEG, and MP3 formats are supported. WMS is the successor of NetShow Services.

In addition to streaming, WMS also has the ability to cache and record streams, enforce authentication, impose various connection limits, restrict access, use multiple protocols, generate usage statistics, and apply forward error correction (FEC). It can also handle a high number of concurrent connections making it suitable for content providers. Streams can also be distributed between servers as part of a distribution network where each server ultimately feeds a different network/audience. Both unicast and multicast streams are supported (multicast streams also use a proprietary and partially encrypted Windows Media Station (*.nsc) file for use by a player.) Typically, Windows Media Player is used to decode and watch/listen to the streams, but other players are also capable of playing unencrypted Windows Media content (Microsoft Silverlight, VLC, MPlayer, etc.)

64-bit versions of Windows Media Services are also available for increased scalability. The Scalable Networking Pack for Windows Server 2003 adds support for network acceleration and hardware-based offloading, which boosts Windows Media server performance. The newest version, Windows Media Services 2008, for Windows Server 2008, includes a built-in WMS Cache/Proxy plug-in which can be used to configure a Windows Media server either as a cache/proxy server or as a reverse proxy server so that it can provide caching and proxy support to other Windows Media servers. Microsoft claims that these offloading technologies nearly double the scalability, making Windows Media Services, according to the claim, the industry's most powerful streaming media server.

Windows Media Services 2008 is no longer included with the setup files for the Windows Server 2008 operating system, but is available as a free download. It is also not supported on Windows Server 2012, having been replaced with IIS Media Services.

== Releases ==
- NetShow Server 3.0 (Windows NT 4.0)
- NetShow Services 4.0 (Windows NT 4.0 SP3 or later)
- Windows Media Services 4.1 (Included in Windows 2000 Server family and downloadable for previous Windows versions)
- Windows Media Services 9 Series (Included in Windows Server 2003, works with IIS 6)
- Windows Media Services 2008 (Downloadable for Windows Server 2008, works with IIS 7)

== See also ==
- Microsoft Media Server
- Windows Media Encoder
- Windows Media Player
- Microsoft Silverlight
