= Microsoft Movies & TV =

Defunct digital video service

- Screenshot of Movies & TV app in Windows 10
- Other names: Xbox Video; Zune Video
- Developer: Microsoft
- Release: October 16, 2012; 14 years ago as Xbox Video
- Stable release: September 2026 Update (10.26091.1001) / October 21, 2026; 13 days ago
- Operating system: Windows 10, 11; Windows Server 2012+; Xbox One+; Discontinued: Xbox 360 (2024); Windows 8, 8.1 (2023); Windows 10 Mobile (2020); Windows Phone 8.1 (2017); Windows Phone 8 (2014)
- Type: Television shows; films
- Website: support.microsoft.com/windows/watch-movies-and-tv-shows-on-the-microsoft-movies-tv-app-59328422-053f-30b3-843a-f8774567a85e

Microsoft Movies & TV, also branded Films & TV, was a digital video storefront service developed and run by Microsoft for the Windows and Xbox platforms. It offered Ultra HD movies and TV shows available for rental or purchase from the Microsoft Store. Personal digital collections could be watched and managed within the software app. The service was discontinued on July 18, 2025.

The service originated with the launches of the Zune Marketplace and Xbox Live Video Marketplace on November 14, 2006, designed for media purchasing and consumption on Zune players, Windows computers (using the Zune software) and the Xbox 360 console. The Zune storefront was only for audio, but from 2008 and 2009 also began offering TV shows and movies. The Xbox Live branded service was then integrated into the Zune branded service. The service generally competed more directly with similar online video stores including iTunes Store, Google TV, Amazon Video, and Vudu.

Microsoft replaced and relaunched the service as Xbox Video on October 14, 2012, with audio offerings becoming Xbox Music. It was then renamed Movies & TV in 2015. The Microsoft Movies & TV video player app was superseded by Media Player in 2023 and 2022 respectively on Windows 10 and Windows 11. The Movies & TV service shut down in 2025 as part of Microsoft's continued distancing from consumer services.

| 12 Oct 2004 | MSN Music Store launches |
| 18 Oct 2006 | Release of version 11 of Windows Media Player playback software |
| 22 Nov 2006 | Zune Marketplace and Xbox Live Video Marketplace launches offering music and video downloads respectively |
| 19 Nov 2008 | Zune Pass music subscription service launches |
| 22 Jul 2009 | Release of version 12 of Windows Media Player playback software |
| Fall 2009 | Zune Marketplace gains movies and TV content; Xbox Live Video Marketplace integrates into new Zune Video Marketplace |
| 26 Oct 2012 | Zune brand retired; Xbox Music and Xbox Video streaming services and download stores launches; Xbox Music and Xbox Video apps also replace Windows Media Player as the default media playback software (in Windows 8) |
| 29 Jul 2015 | Xbox Music and Xbox Video apps and streaming services re-branded as Groove Music and Movies & TV/Films & TV respectively; Music and Video download stores merged into the Windows Store (later known as Microsoft Store) |
| 1 Jan 2018 | Discontinuation and shutting down of Groove Music streaming service (Pass) and music downloading from the Microsoft Store |
| 16 Nov 2021 | Release of new Media Player software replacing Groove Music and (for playback purposes) Movies & TV/Films & TV |
| 18 Jul 2025 | Microsoft Movies & TV/Films & TV store shuts down, ending Microsoft's presence in digital music/video distribution |

== History ==
The original emblem of Xbox Video

Xbox Live Marketplace's original video store was replaced by Zune Marketplace on September 15, 2009.

At E3 2009, Microsoft announced their 1080p streaming video service, which allows users to stream video over an internet connection. This technology is a key part of Xbox Video for their video streaming service.

With the announcement of Xbox Music services which would replace the Zune Marketplace music service, speculation arose about "Xbox Video", a potential service that would offer movies and television series, because the term "music" in the name of the service gave the impression that Xbox Music will offer strictly music, thus excluding films and television series.

With the launch of Windows 10, Xbox Video appears under the name of Film & TV in the apps, with the storefront for the content merged into Microsoft Store as a whole as part of Microsoft's universal apps initiative. However the name and branding of Xbox Video remains active on all the previous platforms and the official website.

On September 17, 2015, with a system update for the Xbox 360, the name of the app changed to reflect the new branding. The Xbox One app had also changed in a previous update.

4K resolution streaming began in November 2017. After previously being linked with Movies Anywhere in the past, Microsoft Movies & TV announced that they would be rejoining the service on August 6, 2018.

On August 17, 2023, Microsoft announced that the Microsoft Movies & TV app on Xbox 360 will no longer function as of July 29, 2024.

On July 18, 2025, Microsoft abruptly discontinued purchasing and renting on the platform. Microsoft stated that purchased content would still be accessible via the Movies & TV app.

== See also ==
- Groove Music
- Windows Media Player
- Media Player (2022)
