= Groove Music =

Microsoft audio player software application

- Logo of Groove Music (after 2020)

- Groove Music on Windows 10
- Developer: Microsoft
Stable release
- Windows 10: 10.21102.1042.0. / 27 October 2021; 5 years ago
- Preview release: Windows 11: 11.2110.34.0
- Operating system: Windows 8, Windows 8.1, Windows 10, Xbox One, Xbox 360, Windows 11
- Platform: x86, x64, ARM, ARM64
- Predecessor: Windows Media Player
- Successor: Media Player
- Available in: 113 languages
- Type: audio player
- License: Freeware
- Website: music.microsoft.com

12 Oct 2004	MSN Music Store launches
18 Oct 2006	Release of version 11 of Windows Media Player playback software
22 Nov 2006	Zune Marketplace and Xbox Live Video Marketplace launches offering music and video downloads respectively
19 Nov 2008	Zune Pass music subscription service launches
22 Jul 2009	Release of version 12 of Windows Media Player playback software
Fall 2009	Zune Marketplace gains movies and TV content; Xbox Live Video Marketplace integrates into new Zune Video Marketplace
26 Oct 2012	Zune brand retired; Xbox Music and Xbox Video streaming services and download stores launches; Xbox Music and Xbox Video apps also replace Windows Media Player as the default media playback software (in Windows 8)
29 Jul 2015	Xbox Music and Xbox Video apps and streaming services re-branded as Groove Music and Movies & TV/Films & TV respectively; Music and Video download stores merged into the Windows Store (later known as Microsoft Store)
1 Jan 2018	Discontinuation and shutting down of Groove Music streaming service (Pass) and music downloading from the Microsoft Store
16 Nov 2021	Release of new Media Player software replacing Groove Music and (for playback purposes) Movies & TV/Films & TV
18 Jul 2025	Microsoft Movies & TV/Films & TV store shuts down, ending Microsoft's presence in digital music/video distribution

Groove Music is a discontinued audio player software application and formerly an associated music streaming service from Microsoft. Originally known as Xbox Music before rebranding to Groove Music in 2015, the app was included with Windows 8, Windows 8.1 and Windows 10 (as well as very early builds of Windows 11).

The music streaming service, which was called Groove Music Pass, was supported across Windows, Xbox video game consoles, Windows Phone, as well as Android and iOS. As of 2014, the Groove catalogue had over 50 million tracks. Its subscription service Groove Music Pass was officially discontinued on 31 December 2017, and the Android and iOS versions of the Groove Music app were discontinued in December 2018, restricting the player to its native Microsoft Store base.

The Groove Music software was superseded by Media Player in Windows 10 and Windows 11. The update was rolled out to Windows 10 users between January and June 2023.

== History ==
Groove Music logo (2015–2020)

Microsoft had previously ventured into music services with its Zune brand. The Zune Marketplace included 11 million tracks. The line of Zune players and Zune music store were somewhat unsuccessful, and the brand was largely discontinued at the beginning of the 2010s, although it continued to exist on different devices and the Zune Music Pass offered unlimited access to songs for US$9.99 per month.

During its E3 2012 press conference, and in the wake of the upcoming release of Windows 8, Microsoft announced the relaunch of the service as Xbox Music, which is entirely newly built. With the accompanying announcement of Xbox Video, this move was intended to position Xbox as the company's main entertainment brand. Both services launched on 16 October 2012.

On 6 July 2015, Microsoft announced the re-branding of Xbox Music as Groove to tie in with the impending release of Windows 10. The new brand utilized the Microsoft-owned "Groove" trademark formerly used for the unrelated product Microsoft Office Groove (now OneDrive for Business). Joe Belfiore explained that the re-branding was intended to disassociate the service from the Xbox product line, making it more inclusive to non-Xbox platforms.

On 2 October 2017, Microsoft announced that its subscription service, Groove Music Pass, and music purchases on Windows Store would be discontinued after 31 December 2017, leaving support for playing music stored locally and on OneDrive. At the same time, Microsoft began advertising the competing service Spotify, displaying a banner ad for the service within the Groove Music user interface, and offering the ability to migrate music collections and playlists to Spotify. As a side effect of the discontinuation, on 31 May 2018, Microsoft additionally announced that the Groove Music apps for Android and iOS would also be discontinued and cease functioning on 1 December 2018, with users being redirected to Google Play Music and iTunes Match for similar cloud synchronization functionality (the OneDrive app still offered limited music playback functions within).

Microsoft began replacing the Groove Music app with a new Windows Media Player app in January 2022 via an update from the Microsoft Store; it initially applied to Windows 11, with Windows 10 following suit in January 2023.

== Groove Music Pass ==
Groove Music Pass (formerly Xbox Music Pass and Zune Music Pass) is a discontinued pay subscription service that allowed unlimited streaming of the service's catalog on any device with the service installed. The pricing in the U.S. included monthly and annual subscriptions. A one-month trial offer was available, but those who previously tried the Zune Music Pass subscription prior to the rebranding were ineligible for this offer. An advertising-supported streaming tier was previously available, but discontinued effective 1 December 2014. Music could also be purchased directly from Windows Store.

Users' purchased music, and playlists consisting of songs available on the service could be synced through OneDrive and accessed from multiple devices. Songs in a user's local library on a Windows 8.1 PC could be matched and made available to other devices if available on Groove Music Pass. Custom "radio stations" could be generated using songs related to user-selected songs. Songs could be downloaded for offline listening on smartphones. Uploading of non-Groove music became available on Windows 10.

Windows 10's Anniversary Update allowed users to hide features that require a Groove Music Pass from the interface.

On 2 October 2017, Microsoft announced the discontinuation of the Groove Music Pass service effective 31 December 2017. Existing subscribers were refunded, and Microsoft began promoting Spotify as an alternative by allowing saved playlists to be migrated to the service.

=== Cloud Collection ===
Groove Music lets users create a collection of songs and playlists that roam through the cloud on all the supported devices. The songs can be added from the Groove Music Store or matched (within the Groove Music Catalog) to songs either saved locally on the user's machine or uploaded to the user's OneDrive account for the country the user is in.

=== APIs for developers ===
The Groove Music API provides access to RESTful web services for developers to leverage the catalog and features of the service in their application or website.

=== Geographical availability ===
Blue: Groove Music Pass was available Dark Blue: Only Groove Music Store was available

Countries where Groove was available included:

- Argentina
- Australia
- Austria
- Belgium
- Brazil
- Canada
- Denmark
- Finland
- France
- Germany
- Ireland
- Italy
- Japan (Store only)
- Mexico
- Netherlands
- New Zealand
- Norway
- Portugal
- Spain
- Sweden
- Switzerland
- United Kingdom
- United States

== Supported formats ==
The app in Windows 10 supports a number of formats, including:

- .mp3
- .flac
- .aac
- .m4a
- .wav
- .wma
- .ac3
- .3gp
- .3g2
- .amr
- .mka
- .ogg (on Windows 10 version 1903 and newer)
- .opus (on Windows 10 version 1903 and newer)

== See also ==
- Microsoft Movies & TV
- Bing Audio
- MixRadio
- Windows Media Player
- Windows Media Player (2022)
