= Microsoft Media Server =

Network-streaming protocol by Microsoft

Microsoft Media Server (MMS), a Microsoft proprietary network-streaming protocol, serves to transfer unicast data in Windows Media Services (previously called NetShow Services). MMS can be transported via UDP or TCP. The MMS default port is UDP/TCP 1755.

Microsoft deprecated MMS in favor of RTSP (TCP/UDP port 554) in 2003 with the release of the Windows Media Services 9 Series, but continued to support the MMS for some time in the interest of backward compatibility. Support for the protocol was finally dropped in Windows Media Services 2008.

As of 2012 Microsoft still recommends using "mms://" as a "protocol rollover URL". As part of protocol rollover a Windows Media Player version 9, 10, or 11 client opening an "mms://" URL will attempt to connect first with RTSP over UDP and if that fails it will attempt RTSP over TCP. After an RTSP attempt fails, Windows Media Player versions 9 and 10 will attempt MMS over UDP, then MMS over TCP. If using Windows Media Player 11 and an RTSP attempt fails, or if using a previous version of Windows Media Player and MMS fails, a modified version of a HTTP over TCP connection will be attempted. This modified version is referred to by some third parties as MMSH, and by Microsoft as MS-WMSP (Windows Media HTTP Streaming Protocol). The uniform resource identifier (URI) scheme mms has also been proposed to be used for the unrelated Multimedia Messaging Service (MMS) protocol.

For several years developers of the SDP Multimedia download-tool reverse engineered the MMS protocol and published unofficial documentation for it. However, Microsoft finally released the protocol specification in February 2008.

== See also ==
- Advanced Systems Format
