= DVD Player (Windows) =

Windows software

- DVD Player, running under Windows 10
- Developer: Microsoft
- Stable release: 10.17091.1038.0 (2018; 8 years ago) [±]
- Operating system: Microsoft Windows
- Predecessor: Windows Media Player; Windows Media Center

DVD Player is a discontinued software app developed by Microsoft for playing DVD-Video on Microsoft Windows. Originally introduced in Windows 98, DVD Player was included in Windows Me and Windows 2000 but was removed starting with Windows XP, where DVD playback capabilities were integrated into Windows Media Player and Windows Media Center. With Windows 8, Microsoft removed DVD codecs from Windows Media Player, and in Windows 10, Media Center was discontinued entirely. As a result, DVD Player was reintroduced in Windows 10 as a new standalone app, available for download from the Microsoft Store to support DVD playback.

Support for Windows DVD Player alongside the Mail, Calendar and People apps ended on December 31, 2024. Microsoft recommends users to use VLC media player or PowerDVD for playing DVDs instead.

== Windows 98, 2000, and ME versions ==
DVD Player in Windows ME

When DVD Player is launched, it scans all local drives alphabetically, starting with the C: drive, searching for a Video_TS folder. Once this folder is located, the player loads the data file within it and begins video playback. If a Video_TS folder is found on a drive that precedes the DVD drive alphabetically, the player will attempt to play data from this first-located folder instead.

In Windows 98, Windows 98 SE, and Windows 2000 RTM, DVD Player requires a hardware-based MPEG decoder to play DVDs. However, beginning with Windows Me and Windows 2000 SP1, DVD Player supports software-based MPEG decoders as well.

Starting with Windows XP, DVD Player was removed in favor of DVD playback capabilities built directly into Windows Media Player. While the DVDPlay executable remains in %Windir%\system32, it simply redirects to launch Windows Media Player instead. In Windows 8, DVD playback and Windows Media Center became part of a premium add-on available only for Windows 8 Pro, due to the licensing costs for DVD decoders and the market's gradual shift away from DVD-Video.

== Windows 10 version ==
Windows DVD Player was made available for Windows 10 on desktop computers to provide DVD playback functionality. When launched, it searches for movie files in the disc drive. It can also be picked as an option in the AutoPlay dialog when a disc is inserted. However, if the disc is switched, the app needs to restart. It is available as a paid app through Microsoft Store, although it is distributed at no charge to those who had upgraded from an installation of Windows 7 or Windows 8 that included Windows Media Center.

When it launched with Windows 10, the Windows DVD Player had many reports of bugs and customers unable to get it to play DVDs despite its cost of $15. Bad reviews have therefore persisted the Windows DVD Player app.

== See also ==
- DVD player
