= Windows Media =

Multimedia framework for Microsoft Windows

Windows Media is a discontinued multimedia framework for media creation and distribution for Microsoft Windows. It consisted of a software development kit (SDK) with several application programming interfaces (API) and a number of prebuilt technologies, and is the replacement of NetShow technologies.

The Windows Media SDK was replaced by Media Foundation when Windows Vista was released in 2007.

== Pre-2007 ==
The First Version of Windows Media was made in 1991 with the release of the Media center and Media Player, both were basic by today's standard, but at the time it was called by some people "revolutionary", despite no screenshots online.

=== Post-2000s ===
the rest of the services came with the windows XP Media Center Edition in 2001, where the encoder, Media Services app, and the Movie Maker, which lets you make your own videos, was released. it also had live TV w/tuner.

==== Windows Encoder ====
the encoder was a discontinued, freeware media encoder developed by Microsoft which enabled content developers to convert or capture both live and prerecorded audio, video, and computer screen images to Windows Media formats for live and on-demand delivery.

==== Windows Media services ====
The Media services app was a streaming media server software that allowed a Windows Server administrator to generate streaming media (audio/video). Only Windows Media, JPEG, and MP3 formats are supported.

==== Windows Movie Maker ====
The Movie Maker lets you make your own videos to either share to your friends or upload to the Media center. When you finish recording, you have the option to edit the video before you share.

== Post-2007 ==
=== 2007-2014 ===
==== Windows Vista and Windows 7 ====
with the release of Windows Vista, Windows Media became Media foundation, and was featured in premium editions. This was the same with the release of Windows 7 despite them being released 2 years apart from each other.

==== WIndows 8/8.1 ====
with the release of Windows 8 and 8.1, Media center became a paid addon which was optional as their "all services" focus changed

=== 2015-present ===
==== Windows 10 & 11 ====
with the release of Windows 10 and 11, The Media center was replaced with Groove Music until 2023, where a new Media player app was released to all Windows computers since 2015.

== Software ==
- Windows Media Center
- Windows Media Player
- Windows Media Encoder
- Windows Media Services
- Windows Movie Maker

== Formats ==
- Advanced Systems Format (ASF)
- Advanced Stream Redirector (ASX)
- Windows Media Audio (WMA)
- Windows Media Playlist (WPL)
- Windows Media Video (WMV) and VC-1
- Windows Media Station (NSC)
- WMV HD, (Windows Media Video High Definition), the branding name for high definition (HD) media content encoded using Windows Media codecs. WMV HD is not a separate codec.
- HD Photo (formerly Windows Media Photo, standardized as JPEG XR)
- DVR-MS, the recording format used by Windows Media Center
- SAMI, the closed caption format developed by Microsoft. It can be used to synchronize captions and audio descriptions with online video.

== Protocols ==
- Media Stream Broadcast (MSB), for multicast distribution of Advanced Systems Format content over a network
- Media Transfer Protocol (MTP), for transferring and synchronizing media on portable devices
- Microsoft Media Services (MMS), the streaming transport protocol
- Windows Media DRM, an implementation of digital rights management
