= BridgeHead Software =

Software company in United Kingdom

BridgeHead Software Ltd
- Industry: Computer software and services for hospitals
- Founded: 1994
- Headquarters: Leatherhead, Surrey
- Area served: United Kingdom
- Key people: James Beagle, CEO; Charles Cotterill, CPO; Gareth Griffiths, Executive Director; Mike Ball, CBDO; Simon Peters, Company Secretary
- Number of employees: 60
- Website: www.BridgeHeadSoftware.com

BridgeHead Software is a group of computer software and services companies mainly serving the healthcare sector. The parent company BridgeHead Software Limited is unquoted and registered in London, England. The group is headquartered in Leatherhead, Surrey in the UK.

The group operates in North America through a wholly owned subsidiary BridgeHead Software Inc based in Woburn, MA. It also wholly owns BridgeHead Systems Ltd, a UK-registered company which holds title to its proprietary software.

== Products ==
The company sells backup and archival software which is mainly used in North American hospitals as an adjunct to the MEDITECH healthcare information system (which is not supplied with an integral backup or archiving capability). However, BridgeHead products are also used in other sectors including the military, government and utilities, and there is some use of BridgeHead software outside North America, notably in the UK where the company was founded.

During the COVID-19 pandemic BridgeHead supplied the UK National Health Service with mobile clinical testing software.

== History ==
BridgeHead Software was founded in 1994 by Charles "Tony" Cotterill, its current Chief Product Officer. The name BridgeHead derives from his intention to provide a bridgehead, or beachhead, for US companies wishing to expand into Europe. BridgeHead started selling proprietary software when it acquired a team of software developers from the now defunct Multistream Systems Ltd in 1999.

== Ownership ==
The company is an unquoted limited company. The majority of its shares are held by its employees, however its audited accounts indicate the founder and his family are the overall controlling entity.

== Management ==
- Jim Beagle - President & Chief Executive Officer
- Tony Cotterill - Founder and Chairman of the Board of Directors
- Michael Ball - Chief Business Development Officer
- Simon Peters - VP Finance & Administration
- Crispin Jewitt - VP Products & Engineering
- Steve Matheson - VP of North American Sales
- Kenneth Wilson - VP Global Services and Support
- Gareth Griffiths - Executive Director
