= Windows Media Player =

Media player and media library application by Microsoft

Windows Media Player Legacy

- Windows Media Player 12 running on Windows 11
- Developer: Microsoft
- Operating system: Windows NT 4.0; Mac OS 7; Mac OS X; Solaris
- Included with: Windows 3.0 MME and Windows 3.1; Windows 9x; Windows 2000, Windows Me, Windows XP, Windows Vista, Windows 7, Windows 8, Windows 8.1, Windows 10, Windows 11 (Note: Except for "N" and "KN" editions of Windows, as well as Windows RT); Windows CE and Windows Mobile; Mac OS 8 and 9
- Predecessor: ActiveMovie Control, CD Player, DVD Player, NetShow
- Successor: Groove Music, Microsoft Movies & TV, Windows Media Player (2022)
- Type: Media player
- Website: support.microsoft.com/en-gb/windows/windows-media-player-d10303a5-896c-2ce2-53d4-5bd5b9fd888b

Windows Media Player (WMP, officially known as Windows Media Player Legacy since Windows 11 to distinguish it from its successor) is a media player and media library organization software from Microsoft that plays audio and video in Microsoft Windows. It has been a component of the Windows operating system, also including Pocket PC and Windows Mobile. Microsoft also released editions of Windows Media Player for classic Mac OS, Mac OS X, and Solaris, but has since discontinued them.

In addition to being a media player, Windows Media Player can rip audio files from compact discs, burn Audio CDs or MP3 CDs, synchronize content with a digital audio player or mobile devices, and stream media over the local network. It also has support for many skins. Originally, it could connect to a number of digital music stores, allowing its users to purchase digital music. The default file formats are Windows Media Video (WMV), Windows Media Audio (WMA), and Advanced Systems Format (ASF), and its own XML based playlist format called Windows Playlist (WPL). The player is also able to utilize a digital rights management service in the form of Windows Media DRM.

Windows Media Player is a unique component in the sense that each version of Windows came with two or more versions of it side-by-side since 1999. For example, Media Player versions 5.1, 6.4, and 8 were all included in Windows XP. Each version of Windows may bundle several other media playback apps, namely ActiveMovie Control, CD Player, DVD Player, Windows Media Center, and Microsoft Movies & TV.

Windows Media Player 11 is the last out-of-band version of Media Player. It was made available for Windows XP and is included in Windows Vista and Windows Server 2008. Version 12 was released in 2009 along with Windows 7 (Note: N and KN versions of Windows 7 do not include Windows Media Player by default.) and has not been made available for previous versions of Windows nor has it been updated ever since. Windows 8 bundled Windows Media Player 12 along two other media player apps, namely Xbox Video and Xbox Music which became the new default. While Xbox Video became Microsoft Movies & TV, the latter was renamed Groove Music in Windows 10, and then finally Media Player in Windows 11 which has also been backported to Windows 10.

== History ==
Media Player 5.0 running in Windows 2000

The first version of Windows Media Player was released in October 1991, when Windows 3.0 with Multimedia Extensions was released. Originally called Media Player, this component was included with "Multimedia PC"-compatible machines but not available for retail sale. It was capable of playing .mmm animation files, and could be extended to support other formats. It used MCI to handle media files. Being a component of Windows, Media Player shows the same version number as that of the version of Windows with which it was included.

Microsoft continually produced new programs to play media files. In November of the following year, Video for Windows was introduced with the ability to play digital video files in an AVI container format, with codec support for RLE and Video1, and support for playing uncompressed files. Indeo 3.2 was added in a later release. Video for Windows was first available as a free add-on to Windows 3.1, and later integrated into Windows 95 and Windows NT 4.0. In 1995, Microsoft released ActiveMovie with DirectX Media SDK. ActiveMovie incorporates a new way of dealing with media files, and adds support for streaming media (which the original Media Player could not handle). In 1996, ActiveMovie was renamed DirectShow. However, Media Player continued to come with Windows until Windows XP, in which it was officially renamed Windows Media Player v5.1. ("v5.1" is the version number of Windows XP).

In 1999, Windows Media Player's versioning broke away from that of Windows itself. Windows Media Player 6.x came as an out-of-band update for Windows 95-98 and Windows NT 4.0 that co-existed with Media Player and became a built-in component of Windows 98 SE and Windows 2000 with an mplayer2.exe stub allowing to use this built-in instead of newer versions. Windows Media Player 7.0 and its successors also came with a wmplayer.exe stub, replacing each other but leaving Media Player and Windows Media Player 6.4 intact. Windows Me and Windows XP are the two operating systems to have three different versions of Windows Media Player side by side. All versions branded Windows Media Player (instead of simply Media Player) support DirectShow codecs. Version 7 of Windows Media Player was a large revamp, with a new user interface, visualizations and increased functionality. Windows Vista, however, dropped older versions of Windows Media Player in favor of Windows Media Player 11, which included the removal of the Windows Media Source Filter (DirectShow codec).

In 2004, Microsoft launched digital music store MSN Music which came bundled with Windows Media Player 10 to compete with Apple’s iTunes. However, MSN Music was discontinued in 2006 with the launch of Zune music players.

Windows Media Player 12 running on Windows 7

Beginning with Windows Vista, Windows Media Player supports the Media Foundation framework besides DirectShow; as such it plays certain types of media using Media Foundation as well as some types of media using DirectShow. Windows Media Player 12 was released with Windows 7. It included support for more media formats and added new features. With Windows 8, however, the player did not receive an upgrade.

On April 16, 2012, Microsoft announced that Windows Media Player would not be included in Windows RT, the line of Windows designed to run on ARM-based devices.

== Windows Media Player (2022) ==
A different app called Media Player is the successor to Groove Music (previously Xbox Music) and Windows Media Player. Media Player started to be offered to all Windows 11 users on February 15, 2022, with Windows 10 users following in January 2023.

The new Media Player can also play video, as part of Groove's rebranding from a music streaming service to a media player. Other changes include the album cover view being in fullscreen, and a refresh to the mini player. Accessibility has also been improved, with added keyboard shortcuts and hotkey support for keyboard users and with other assistive technologies.

== Features ==
=== Core playback and library functions ===
Windows Media Player supports playback of audio, video and pictures, along with fast forward, reverse, file markers (if present) and variable playback speed (seek & time compression/dilation introduced in WMP 9 Series). It supports local playback, streaming playback with multicast streams and progressive downloads. Items in a playlist can be skipped over temporarily at playback time without removing them from the playlist. Full keyboard-based operation is possible in the player.

Windows Media Player supports full media management, via the integrated media library introduced first in version 7, which offers cataloguing and searching of media and viewing media metadata. Media can be arranged according to album, artist, genre, date et al. Windows Media Player 9 Series introduced Quick Access Panel to browse and navigate the entire library through a menu. The Quick Access Panel was also added to the mini-mode in version 10 but was entirely removed in version 11. WMP 9 Series also introduced ratings and Auto Ratings. Windows Media Player 10 introduced support for aggregating pictures, Recorded TV shows, and other media into the library. A fully featured tag editor was featured in versions 9-11 of WMP, called the Advanced Tag Editor. However, the feature was removed in Windows Media Player 12. Since WMP 9 Series, the player features dynamically updated Auto Playlists based on criteria. Auto Playlists are updated every time users open them. WMP 9 Series or later also supports Auto Ratings which automatically assigns ratings based on the number of times a song is played. Pre-populated auto playlists are included in Windows Media Player 9 Series. Custom Auto Playlists can be created only on Windows XP or later.

In Windows Media Player 11, the Quick Access Panel was removed and replaced with an Explorer-style navigation pane on the left which can be customized for each library to show the user selected media or metadata categories, with contents appearing on the right, in a graphical manner with thumbnails featuring album art or other art depicting the item. Missing album art can be added directly to the placeholders in the Library itself (though the program re-renders all album art imported this way into 1x1 pixel ratio, 200x200 resolution JPEGs). There are separate Tiles, Icons, Details or Extended Tiles views for Music, Pictures, Video and Recorded TV which can be set individually from the navigation bar. Entries for Pictures and Video show their thumbnails. Version 11 also introduced the ability to search and display results on-the-fly as characters are being entered, without waiting for Enter key to be hit. Incremental search results are refined based on further characters that are typed. Stacking allows graphical representations of how many albums there are in a specific category or folder. The pile appears larger as the category contains more albums. The List pane includes an option to prompt the user to remove items skipped in a playlist upon save or skip them only during playback.

=== Visualizations ===
Windows Media Player 11 running in mini-mode (in Windows XP MCE) showing the "Bars" preset of the "Bars and Waves" visualization

While playing music, Windows Media Player can show visualizations, which were first introduced in version 7. The current three visualizations are Alchemy, which was first introduced in version 9, Bars and Waves, which has been used since version 7, and Battery, introduced version 8. Versions 7 and 8 included with Me and XP respectively includes an additional visualization called "Musical Colors", which is not present in out-of-band releases of version 7 as well as version 9 onwards, but is retained if Windows Media Player was upgraded from version 7 or 8.

Version 11 and above refrains from having the former "Ambience," "Particle," "Plenoptic," and "Spikes" visualizations from versions 7 to 10. The reason for their removal was that the visualizations do not support full screen controls (either the visualization gets shifted to the left while there is a thick black bar to the right side of the screen, or that there are no full screen controls).

More visualizations could be downloaded from Microsoft's official website; however the downloads have since been taken down. These include "BlazingColors," "ColorCubes," "PulsingColors," "Softie the Snowman," "Yule Log," etc., all of which were originally offered as optional extras in version 7 via the bonus pack. As of today, these visualizations, among others, can still be found on some websites such as the WMP Goodies site.

=== Format support ===
The player includes intrinsic support for Windows Media codecs and also WAV and MP3 media formats. On Windows XP and above with WMP 9 Series or later, the Windows Media Audio Professional codec is included which supports multichannel audio at up to 24-bit 192 kHz resolution. Windows Media Player 11 includes the Windows Media Format 11 runtime which adds low bitrate support (below 128 kbit/s for WMA Pro), support for ripping music to WMA Pro 10 and updates the original WMA to version 9.2.

Support for any media codec and container format can be added using specific DirectShow filters or Media Foundation codecs (Media Foundation codecs only in Windows Vista or later). The player will not play MP3 files that contain compressed ID3 headers ("tags"); trying to do so results in a "The input media file is invalid" error message. MP3 playback support was built-in beginning with version 6.1 and audio CD playback was natively supported with version 7.

DVD playback features minus the necessary decoders were integrated into Windows Media Player 8 for Windows XP. The player activates DVD and Blu-ray playback functionality with support for menus, titles and chapters, parental controls and audio track language selection if compatible decoders are installed. MPEG-2 and Dolby Digital (AC-3) decoders were included beginning with Windows Media Player 11 on Windows Vista (Home Premium and Ultimate editions only) and Windows 7 (Home Premium, Ultimate, or Enterprise editions) to allow DVD playback without additional software. However, the decoders were subsequently removed in Windows 8 and Windows 10 due to licensing costs.

Windows Media Player 12 adds native support for H.264 and MPEG-4 Part 2 video formats, ALAC, AAC audio and 3GP, MP4 and MOV container formats. Windows Media Player 12 is also able to play AVCHD formats (.M2TS and .mts).

As of Windows 10, Windows Media Player 12 can play FLAC, HEVC, and SubRip subtitle, and Matroska container formats. Although the WebM file type is not officially associated with Windows Media Player 12 (the default player is Microsoft Movies & TV), playback of VP9 video in WebM container is possible on Windows 10 v1809 or later.

==== Windows Media Player Mobile ====
Windows Media Player Mobile 10 on Windows Mobile 6.5 supports MP3, ASF, WMA, and WMV using WMV or MPEG-4 codecs.

=== Disc burning, ripping, and playback ===
Windows Media Player features integrated Audio CD-burning support since version 7 as well as data CD burning support since Windows Media Player 9 Series on Windows XP or later. Data CDs can have any of the media formats supported by the player. While burning Data CDs, the media can, optionally, be transcoded into WMA format and playlists can be added to the CD as well. Starting with WMP 9 Series, audio CDs can be burnt with volume leveling.

Audio CDs can be ripped as WMA or WMA 10 Pro (WMA 10 Pro in WMP 11 or later) at 48, 64, 96, 128, 160, and 192 kbit/s, WMA lossless (470 to 940 kbit/s) (9 Series on XP or later), WMA variable bitrate (from 40 to 75 kbit/s up to 240-355 kbit/s), MP3 at 128, 192, 256, and 320 kbit/s, or uncompressed WAV (WAV ripping in WMP 11 or later). Since WMP 9 Series, 20 bit high-resolution CDs (HDCDs) are also supported, if capable audio hardware is present. Audio can be ripped using error correction and ripped audio can be protected with Windows Media DRM. Ripping to MP3 is supported only in Windows Media Player 8 for Windows XP or later if a compatible MP3 encoder is installed. Windows Media Player 10 included the Fraunhofer MP3 Professional encoder. Information on CDs such as album name, artist and track listings can optionally be automatically downloaded from the online Windows Media database when the CD is inserted. Version 11 added support for ripping audio CDs to WAV and WMA 10 Pro formats. With their 2015 implementation in Windows 10, Version 12 also added lossless FLAC and ALAC formats for ripping and playback. For burning, version 11 shows a graphical bar indicating how much space will be used on the disc and introduced Disc spanning which splits a burn list onto multiple discs in case the content does not fit on one disc.

=== Portable device sync ===
Windows Media Player allows the user to connect, share and sync data with portable handheld devices and game consoles since version 7. Media can be optionally transcoded to a format better suited for the target device, automatically, when synchronizing. When deleting playlists from devices, Windows Media Player can automatically remove their contents. Devices can be formatted using Windows Media Player 9 Series or later. Version 10 or later support the Media Transfer Protocol and Auto Sync. Auto Sync allows users to specify criteria such as recently added music or highest rated songs, by which media will be automatically synchronized with the portable device and other advanced features like setting the clock on the portable device automatically, communicating with the device to retrieve the user's preferences. Windows Media Player 10 also introduced the UMDF-based Windows Portable Devices API.

Version 11 has improved synchronization features for loading content onto PlaysForSure-compatible portable players. WMP 11 supports reverse-synchronization, by which media present on the portable device can be replicated back to the PC. Shuffle Sync can be used to randomize content synced with the portable device, Multi PC Sync to synchronize portable device content across multiple PCs and Guest Sync to synchronize different content from multiple PCs with the portable device. Portable devices appear in the navigation pane of the library where their content can be browsed and searched.

Windows Media Player's 'Sync' function has options that allow it to be set to automatically down-convert (transcode) high bit-rate song files to a lower bit-rate. This down-conversion function is switched on by default. This is useful for providing low bit-rate files to those portable devices that need them, and to save space on portable devices with smaller storage capacities. For high bit-rate capable devices with sufficient storage capabilities, the down conversion process can be omitted.

In versions 11 (2006) and 12 (2009), the Quality settings that the user has selected in the Windows Media Player settings for Sync, for that specific portable device, are used to control the quality (bit-rate) of files that are copied to the portable device. Leaving the Quality settings to Automatic will often result in 192kbs files being copied to the portable device. Manual settings can also be made. 192kbs is the highest quality down-conversion bit-rate that can be manually selected when the Sync function's down-conversion function is turned on. Lower bit-rates can also be selected.

For portable devices that can handle high bit-rate files, the best quality files are obtained by leaving the down-conversion process switched off (unchecked) for that specific device. In Windows Media Player Version 11, switching off the down-conversion function is done in the Quality tab of the Advanced Options of the Sync settings for the device. In Windows Media Player Version 12, switching off the down-conversion function is done in the Quality tab of the Properties for the device in the Select Settings for the device in the Sync Options menu.

When set up in such a way, Windows Media Player's 'Sync' function can be used to sync unchanged high bit-rate song files to suitable portable devices (i.e. those capable of using file formats such as WMA Lossless, mp3-360kbs, etc.). For example, some users have created large song libraries on their PCs containing .wma formatted song files using the high bit-rate WMA Lossless (WMA-LL) protocol, or using other high bit-rate song file formats. The WMA-LL protocol is selectable in Windows Media Player as an option when ripping songs from CDs. The resulting bit-rates seen on ripped WMA-LL files are often 3 to 6 times higher than 192kbs, and can typically fall anywhere in the range of 600kbs to 1200kbs, depending on the quality of the source file that was present on the CD in the first place. The sound quality is much improved over the default rate, although the file size is larger.

At the time that Versions 11 and 12 were released, the capabilities and capacities of portable devices typically required down-conversion of the bit-rates of the files placed on the portable devices. Thus, Sync down-conversion was turned on by default. This was to ensure playability of the files and to ensure that the file sizes were small enough to efficiently fit a reasonably large selection of songs on the portable device.

In recent years (circa 2012), portable devices became available that could natively play these Windows Media Player produced high bit-rate WMA-LL files (and others), and that have storage capacities suitable for large collections of high bit-rate song files. This made it much more practicable and desirable to use software programs such as Windows Media Player to synchronize previously PC-bound libraries of high bit-rate songs to these new portable devices.

=== Enhanced playback features ===
Windows Media Player features universal brightness, contrast, saturation and hue adjustments and pixel aspect ratio for supported video formats. It also includes a 10-band graphic equalizer with presets and SRS WOW audio post-processing system. Windows Media Player can also have attached audio and video DSP plug-ins which process the output audio or video data. Video Smoothing was introduced in WMP 9 Series (Windows XP or later only) which upscales frame-rate by interpolating added frames, in effect giving a smoother playback on low-framerate videos. The player supports subtitles and closed-captioning for local media, video on demand streaming or live streaming scenarios. Typically Windows Media captions support the SAMI file format but can also carry embedded closed caption data.

The player can use video overlays or VMR (Video Mixing Renderer) surfaces, if the video card supports them. In Windows XP, it uses VMR7 by default, but can also be made to use the more advanced YUV mixing mode by enabling the "Use high quality mode" option in Advanced Performance settings. This turns on deinterlacing, scaling and improved color accuracy. WMP 9 Series introduced native playback for deinterlacing for TV output. Version 9 introduced DXVA accelerated playback. Version 11 introduced improved support for DirectX accelerated decoding of WMV video (DXVA decoding). Up to version 11, it supported static lyrics and "Synchronized Lyrics", by which different lines of lyrics can be time-stamped, so that they display only at those times. Synchronized Lyrics also were accessible through the Advanced Tag Editor which was removed in version 12.

Since Windows Media Player 9 Series, the player supports crossfading, audio dynamic range (Quiet Mode) for WMA Pro and WMA Lossless, and auto volume leveling for certain media which includes volume level/gain information such as MP3 or Windows Media. The player also supports extensive configurable privacy and security settings.

=== Shell integration ===
The player has Windows Explorer shell integration to add files and playlist to the Now Playing pane and other playlists can be controlled from the Windows Explorer shell itself, via right-click menu. The My Music folder also includes a separate My Playlists folder where playlists are maintained. When the player is closed and reopened, simply clicking the play button restores the last playlist even if it was not saved. Starting with Windows Media Player 10, the playlist pane is also visible from the Library view. AutoPlay handlers in Windows expose various Windows Media Player tasks.

Windows Media Player 11 running in mini-mode in Windows Vista and Windows XP respectively (notice the difference in the logo)

Up to version 11, it featured a taskbar-mounted Mini-mode in which the most common media control buttons are presented as a toolbar on the Windows taskbar. Flyout windows can display media information, the active visualization or the video being played back. Mini-mode was introduced as a shell player powertoy for Windows Media Player 8 in Windows XP and integrated later into WMP 9 Series. Mini-mode has been removed as an option in Windows Media Player 12 in favor of controls in the taskbar's interactive thumbnail preview which lacks volume control, a progress bar and information displayed whenever a new song is played, however this can be restored by acquiring the wmpband.dll file from Windows Media Player 11 and registering it, where it will work as intended.

The user interface has been redesigned in Windows Media Player 12 such that the Now Playing view plays media in a separate minimalist window with floating playback controls, and also gives access to the current playlist, visualizations, and enhancements. Enhancements are housed in individual undocked windows. The library view includes the rest of the media management functions. It also can preview songs from the library when users hover over the media file and click the Preview button. Windows Media Player 12 can play unprotected songs from the iTunes library. As previously mentioned, taskbar-integrated mini-mode has been replaced with controls in the taskbar's interactive thumbnail preview (called the Thumbnail Toolbar), albeit minus the volume control function, track and album information shown whenever a new song is played and the progress bar. The taskbar icon also supports jump lists introduced in Windows 7.

The thumbnail viewer of Windows Media Player 12 in Windows 7

=== Extensibility ===
The player has had skinning support since Windows Media Player (WMP) 7 (see "Skinning support" below) and includes a color chooser since the WMP 9 Series. Not all functions are usually exposed in skin mode. Windows Media Player 10 allows setting the video border color. Color chooser has been removed in WMP 12. It supports visualizations and Info Center View (Info Center View in WMP 9 Series or later) which displays media metadata fetched from the internet. Full screen visualizations are supported in WMP 9 Series or later. It supports Background plug-ins, window plug-ins and Now Playing plug-ins to control media playback besides DSP and renderer plug-ins. Plug-in support was introduced in WMP 9 Series.

=== Online features ===
The player integrates web-browsing support to browse digital music stores, shop for music and tune to internet radio stations since version 7. It provides an embeddable ActiveX control for Internet Explorer so that developers can play Windows Media on web pages. Windows Media Player 10 or later feature integration with a large number of digital music stores and selecting a music store switches the Info Center view, radio and other online features to use services from that store. Purchased music from a particular store appears in a separate library node under the respective category.

=== Media streaming ===
Previously, Microsoft had released Windows Media Connect for Windows XP to stream media content with its built-in UPnP media server. With version 11 of Windows Media Player, Media Sharing was integrated and allows content (Music, Pictures, Video) to be streamed to and from Universal Plug and Play (UPnP) AV enabled devices such as the PS3, Xbox 360, and Roku SoundBridge. This includes DRM protected PlaysForSure content. WMP 11 on Windows Vista can also act as a client to connect to remote media libraries using this feature; this is not available on the Windows XP version.

With version 12, media streaming was further improved. While previous versions streamed media to UPnP compliant devices (Digital Media Server role) and could play media by fetching it from a network share (Digital Media Player role), Windows Media Player 12 can access media from the shared media libraries on the network or HomeGroup, stream media to DLNA 1.5 compliant devices and allows itself (once the remote control option is turned on) to be remotely controlled by Digital Media Controller devices which stream media (Digital Media Renderer role). Similarly, the Play To feature once enabled for remote PCs, by turning on remote control of the player, allows compliant devices and computers to be discovered and controlled remotely from a computer running Windows Media Player 12 (Digital Media Controller role). If the devices do not support the streamed format, Windows Media Player 12 transcodes the format on-the-fly. Media from a home network can also be streamed over the internet using an Online ID Provider service, which handles discovery of the computer's IP address, authorization, security, connectivity and Quality of Service issues.

=== Skinning support ===
Windows Media Player features native skinning support since version 7, which allows for the appearance of the player to be changed. These can be accessed under a mode called "Skin Mode". Currently, Windows Media Player has two default skins: Corporate (formerly known as "(Default Media Player)"), which was first introduced in version 8, and Revert, which first shipped with version 9. The "Corporate" skin is not deletable.

Previously, there were many skins offered, some of which were included with Windows beginning with Windows Me. The initial set of skins introduced in version 7 were "Classic", "Headspace", "Miniplayer", "Optik", "Roundlet", "Rusty", and "Toothy". One skin, which was modeled after the user interface of version 7, is the default skin that is built-in to the player and not deletable; this skin is labeled as "(Default Media Player)". Version 7 included with Windows Me added additional skins such as "Canvas", "Heart", "Pyrite", "Splat", and "WinME". The bonus pack for version 7 also includes an additional set of skins like "Atomic", "Bluesky", "DigitalDJ", "Figure8", "Gyrosphere", "Luminescence", "Melvin", "Radio", and "PowerToys".

Version 8 included with Windows XP includes most of the skins from version 7 and Windows Me as well as some version 7 bonus pack skins but adds some new ones such as "Goo", as well as two additional skins, "Windows Classic" and "Windows XP". The default built-in skin (which was still labeled as "(Default Media Player)") and the "Miniplayer" skin were updated to use the UI design of version 8, while the default built-in skin of version 7 became "Compact" and was now size adjustable. Both the "Classic" and "Compact" skins were updated to use the then-new logo introduced with Windows XP. One of the version 7 bonus pack skins, "DigitalDJ", is included with version 8, albeit renamed and reskinned as "Iconic".

Version 9 does not include any other skins from version 7 and 8, with the only other skins being "9SeriesDefault" (included in out-of-band versions only) and "Revert", along with the default built-in skin from version 8 which was renamed to "Corporate". Version 10 onwards only has two skins, the "Revert" skin from version 9 and the built-in "Corporate" skin from version 8.

Other skins have also appeared in other products such as the two Microsoft Plus! add-ons for Windows XP, which includes four skins in the first pack and seven skins in the second pack. A subset of skins from these packs were also included in version 10 included with Windows XP Media Center Edition 2005.

These skins, such as the ones listed above, are retained if the player is upgraded from a previous version. Some skins such as the ones listed above can be downloaded from Microsoft's website but have since been removed.

Microsoft announced Skins will not be supported on Windows Media Player Legacy on Windows 11 24H2 update and above on November 10, 2026.

== Releases ==
The following are the releases of Windows Media Player. Prior to the release of Windows Media Player in Windows 98 Second Edition, separate programs, CD Player, Deluxe CD Player, DVD Player and Media Player, were included in old versions of Microsoft Windows for playback of media files. Only Windows Media Player 11 is not available for Windows Server 2003.

Windows Media Player versions
Version	Original release	Included with	Available for
Microsoft Windows
Media Player (2022)	February 15, 2022	Windows 11	Windows 10
Windows Media Player 12	July 22, 2009	Windows 7 or later Windows Server 2008 R2 or later	—N/a
Windows Media Player 11	October 18, 2006	Windows Vista; Windows Server 2008	Windows XP (SP2+); Windows XP x64 Edition; Windows XP Media Center Edition 2005
Windows Media Player 10	August 25, 2004	Windows XP x64 Edition; Windows XP Media Center Edition 2005; Windows Server 2003 (SP1+)	Windows XP; Windows Server 2003
Windows Media Player 9 Series	January 7, 2003	Windows XP (SP2+); Windows Server 2003 (RTM)	Windows 98 SE; Windows 2000; Windows Me; Windows XP
Windows Media Player for Windows XP (version 8)	August 24, 2001	Windows XP (RTM & SP1)	—N/a
Windows Media Player 7.1	May 16, 2001	—N/a	Windows 98; Windows 2000; Windows Me
Windows Media Player 7.0	June 19, 2000	Windows ME	Windows 95; Windows NT 4.0; Windows 98; Windows 2000
Windows Media Player 6.4 (Note: Windows Media Player 6.4 was shipped side-by-side with later versions of WMP in Windows ME and Windows XP.)	September 15, 1999	Windows 2000; Windows Me (hidden); Windows XP (hidden); Windows Server 2003 (hidden); Internet Explorer 5.01; Internet Explorer 5.5; Internet Explorer 6.0	Windows 95; Windows NT 4.0; Windows 98
Windows Media Player 6.1	March 1999	Windows 98 SE; Internet Explorer 5.0	Windows 95; Windows NT 4.0; Windows 98
Windows Media Player 6.0	September 1998	DirectX Media 6.0; Internet Explorer 4.01 (SP2)	Windows 95; Windows NT 4.0; Windows 98
Windows Media Player 5.2	July 1998	Internet Explorer 4.01	Windows 3.1; Windows 95; Windows NT 4.0; Windows 98
Microsoft Media Player 5.1	2001	Windows XP (hidden)	—N/a
Media Player 5.0	1999	Windows 2000 (hidden)	—N/a
Media Player 4.9	2000	Windows Me (hidden)	—N/a
Media Player 4.1	1998	Windows 98; Windows 98 SE (hidden)	—N/a
Media Player 4.0 (Unicode)	1996	Windows NT 4.0	—N/a
Media Player 4.0 (ANSI)	1995	Windows 95	—N/a
Media Player 3.51	1995	Windows NT 3.51	—N/a
Media Player 3.5	1994	Windows NT 3.5	—N/a
Media Player 3.15	1992	—N/a	Windows 3.1 with Video for Windows
Media Player 3.1 (32-bit)	1993	Windows NT 3.1	—N/a
Media Player 3.1 (16-bit)	1992	Windows 3.1	—N/a
Media Player 3.0	1991	—N/a	Windows 3.0 with Multimedia Extension
Windows Mobile
Windows Media Player 10.3 Mobile	February 12, 2007 (Windows Mobile 6)	Windows Mobile 6 Windows Mobile 6.1	Windows Mobile 5.0
Windows Media Player 10.2 Mobile	?	Windows Mobile 5.0	—N/a
Windows Media Player 10.1 Mobile	May 10, 2005	Windows Mobile 5.0	—N/a
Windows Media Player 10 Mobile	October 12, 2004	Windows Mobile 2003 SE	—N/a
Windows Media Player 9.0.1	March 24, 2004	Windows Mobile 2003 SE	—N/a
Windows Media Player 9 Series	June 23, 2003	Windows Mobile 2003	—N/a
Windows Media Player 8.5	October 11, 2002	Pocket PC 2002	—N/a
Windows Media Player 8.01	July 2002	Pocket PC 2002	—N/a
Windows Media Player 8	October 4, 2001 (Pocket PC)	Pocket PC 2002; Smartphone 2002	—N/a
Windows Media Player 7.1	May 21, 2001	Pocket PC 2000	—N/a
Windows Media Player 7	December 12, 2000	Pocket PC 2000	—N/a
Windows Media Player 1.2	September 7, 2000	Handheld PC 2000	—N/a
Windows Media Player 1.1	?	Palm-size PC CE 2.11	—N/a
Windows Media Player	April 19, 2000	Pocket PC 2000	—N/a
Mac
Windows Media Player 9 Series	November 7, 2003	—N/a	Mac OS X
Windows Media Player 7	July 24, 2001	Mac OS 9	Mac OS 8.x
Windows Media Player 6.3	July 17, 2000	Mac OS 8	Mac OS 7.x
Solaris
Windows Media Player 6.3	July 17, 2000	—N/a	Solaris

== Other versions ==
Microsoft has also released versions of Windows Media Player for other platforms including Windows Mobile, classic Mac OS, Mac OS X, Palm-size PC, Handheld PC, and Solaris. These versions are no longer supported by Microsoft. Version 1 of the Zune software was also based on Windows Media Player; later versions are not.

=== Windows Mobile ===
Windows Media Player 10.3 Mobile on a Windows Mobile 6.5.3 Professional device

Windows Media Player for Pocket PC was first announced on January 6, 2000, and has been revised on a schedule roughly similar to that of the Windows version. Currently known as "Media Player 10 Mobile", this edition (released in October 2004) closely resembles the capabilities of the Windows version of WMP 10, including playlist capabilities, a media library, album art, WMA Lossless playback, support for DRM-protected media, video playback at 640×480 with stereo sound, and the same Energy Blue interface aesthetics also seen in Windows XP Media Center Edition 2005. It also supports synchronization with the desktop version of WMP 10, and additionally supports synchronizing and transcoding of recorded television shows from Media Center. Media Player 10 Mobile is not available as a download from Microsoft, distribution is done solely through OEM partners, and is typically included on devices based on Windows Mobile.

Windows Mobile 6 includes a copy of Windows Media Player 10 Mobile, but with a similar (but not quite identical) theme as Windows Media Player 11.

=== Mac OS X ===
Version 9 was the final version of Windows Media Player to be released for Mac OS X before development was canceled by Microsoft. It was developed by the Windows Media team at Microsoft instead of the Macintosh Business Unit and released in 2003. On release the application lacked many basic features that were found in other media players such as Apple's iTunes and QuickTime. It also lacked support for many media formats that version 9 of the Windows counterpart supported on release 10 months earlier.

The Mac version supported only Windows Media encoded media (up to version 9) enclosed in the ASF format, lacking support for all other formats such as MP4, MPEG, and Microsoft's own AVI format. On the user interface front, it did not prevent screensavers from running during playback, it did not support file drag-and-drop, nor did it support playlists. While Windows Media Player 9 had added support for some files that use the WMV9 codec (also known as the WMV3 codec by the FourCC), in other aspects it was seen as having degraded in features from previous versions.

On January 12, 2006, Microsoft announced it had ceased development of Windows Media Player for Mac. Microsoft now distributes a third-party plugin called WMV Player (produced and maintained by Flip4Mac) which allows some forms of Windows Media to be played within Apple's QuickTime Player and other QuickTime-aware applications.

== Security issues ==
Microsoft Windows Media Runtime in Windows 2000, Windows XP, Windows Vista and Windows Server contained a bug that permitted "remote code execution if a user opened a specially crafted media file". Such a file would allow the attacker to "then install programs; view, change, or delete data; or create new accounts with full user rights", if the account on which the file was played had administrator privileges. The problem was addressed in a critical update issued on September 8, 2009.

== European Commission case ==
In March 2004, the European Commission in the European Union Microsoft antitrust case fined Microsoft €497 million and ordered the company to provide a version of Windows without Windows Media Player, claiming Microsoft "broke European Union competition law by leveraging its near monopoly in the market for PC operating systems onto the markets for work group server operating systems and for media players". The company has made available a compliant version of its flagship operating system under the negotiated name "Windows XP N", though the product has not been very successful. Windows Vista, Windows 7 and Windows 8 are also available in "N" editions. However, it is possible to either install Windows Media Player (XP/Vista) or the Media Restore Pack through Windows Update (Vista) to add the media player.

== See also ==
- Comparison of media players
- Comparison of video player software
- Groove Music
- Media Player Classic, a media player that mimics the appearance of Windows Media Player 6.4
- Media Transfer Protocol
- Windows Media Encoder
- Windows Media Services
