= Microsoft Store =

Digital distribution platform for Microsoft Windows, Xbox One and Series X/S

- Microsoft Store running on Windows 11. Xbox PC Game Pass can be seen in the picture.
- Other names: Windows Store
- Developer: Microsoft
- Release: October 26, 2012; 14 years ago
- Stable release: September 2026 Update (22609.1401.13) / November 9, 2026; 8 days ago
- Written in: C#; XAML (UWP variant)
- Operating system: Windows 10, 11; Windows Server 2012+; Xbox System Software; Discontinued: Windows 8, 8.1 (2023); Windows 10 Mobile (2020)
- Platform: IA-32, x86-64, ARM, ARM64
- Predecessor: Windows Marketplace, Windows Phone Store, Xbox Video, Xbox Music, Xbox Store, Windows Store
- Service name: Windows Store Service (WSService)
- Type: App store; Video game digital distribution; Video on demand (closed in July 2025); Ebook store (closed in July 2019); Online music store (closed in December 2017)
- License: Proprietary
- Website: apps.microsoft.com

The Microsoft Store (formerly known as the Windows Store) is a digital distribution platform operated by Microsoft. It was created as an app store for Windows 8 as the primary means of distributing Universal Windows Platform apps. With Windows 10 1803, Microsoft merged its other distribution platforms (Windows Marketplace, Windows Phone Store, Xbox Music, Xbox Video, Xbox Store, and a web storefront also known as "Microsoft Store") into Microsoft Store, making it a unified distribution point for apps, console games, and digital videos. Digital music was included until the end of 2017, and E-books were included until 2019.

As with other similar platforms, such as the Google Play and Mac App Store, Microsoft Store is curated, and apps must be certified for compatibility and content. In addition to the user-facing Microsoft Store client, the store has a developer portal with which developers can interact. Microsoft takes 5–15% of the sale price for apps and 30% on Xbox games. Prior to January 1, 2015, this cut was reduced to 20% after the developer's profits reached $25,000. In 2021, 669,000 apps were available in the store. Categories containing the largest number of apps are "Books and Reference", "Education", "Entertainment", and "Games". The majority of the app developers have one app.

== History ==
=== The Web-based storefront ===
Microsoft previously maintained a similar digital distribution system for software known as Windows Marketplace, which allowed customers to purchase software online. The marketplace tracked product keys and licenses, allowing users to retrieve their purchases when switching computers. Windows Marketplace was discontinued in November 2008. At this point, Microsoft opened a Web-based storefront called "Microsoft Store".

=== Windows 8 ===
The Windows Store logo as it appeared in 2013

Microsoft first announced Windows Store, a digital distribution service for Windows at its presentation during the Build developer conference on September 13, 2011. Further details announced during the conference revealed that the store would be able to hold listings for both certified traditional Windows apps, as well as what were called "Metro-style apps" at the time: tightly-sandboxed software based on Microsoft design guidelines that are constantly monitored for quality and compliance. For consumers, Windows Store is intended to be the only way to obtain Metro-style apps. While announced alongside the "Developer Preview" release of Windows 8, Windows Store itself did not become available until the "Consumer Preview", released in February 2012.

Updates to apps published on the store after July 1, 2019, are no longer available to Windows 8 RTM users. Per Microsoft lifecycle policies, the RTM version of Windows 8 has been unsupported since January 12, 2016, excluding some Embedded editions, as well its server equivalent, Windows Server 2012.

=== Windows 8.1 ===
An updated version of Windows Store was introduced in Windows 8.1. Its home page was remodeled to display apps in focused categories (such as popular, recommended, top free and paid, and special offers) with expanded details, while the ability for apps to automatically update was also added. Windows 8.1 Update also introduced other notable presentation changes, including increasing the top app lists to return 1000 apps instead of 100 apps, a "picks for you" section, and changing the default sorting for reviews to be by "most popular".

Updates to apps published on the Store after June 30, 2023, are no longer available to Windows 8.1. Per Microsoft lifecycle policies, the Windows 8.1 Update reached the end of its extended support on January 10, 2023, excluding some Embedded editions, as well its server equivalent, Windows Server 2012 R2.

=== Windows 10 ===
Windows 10 was released with an updated version of the Windows Store, which merged Microsoft's other distribution platforms (Windows Marketplace, Windows Phone Store, Xbox Video and Xbox Music) into a unified store front for Windows 10 on all platforms, offering apps, games, music, film, TV series, themes, and ebooks. In June 2017, Spotify became available in the Windows Store.

Old Get it from Microsoft badge used until August 2024

In September 2017, Microsoft began to re-brand Windows Store as Microsoft Store, with a new icon carrying the Microsoft logo. Xbox Store was merged into this new version of the platform. This is in line with Microsoft's platform convergence strategy on all Windows 10-based operating systems.

Web apps and traditional desktop software can be packaged for distribution on Windows Store. Desktop software distributed through Windows Store are packaged using the App-V system to allow sandboxing.

In February 2018, Microsoft announced that Progressive Web Apps would begin to be available in the Microsoft Store, and Microsoft would automatically add selected quality progressive web apps through the Bing crawler or allow developers to submit Progressive Web Apps to the Microsoft Store.

Starting from Windows 10 version 1803, fonts can be downloaded and installed from the Microsoft Store.

=== Windows 11 ===
In Windows 11, Microsoft Store received an updated user interface, and a new pop-up designed to handle installation links from websites. Microsoft also announced a number of changes to its policies for application submissions to improve flexibility and make the store more "open", including supporting "any kind of app, regardless of app framework and packaging technology", and the ability for developers to freely use first- or third-party payment platforms (in non-game software only) rather than those provided by Microsoft.

=== Windows Server ===
The Microsoft Store is not installed by default in Windows Server 2012 or later versions of Windows Server. Apps that would normally be available in the Store can be installed through sideloading.

== Store features ==
Microsoft Store is the primary means of distributing Universal Windows Platform (UWP) apps to users. Sideloading apps from outside the store is supported on Windows 10 on an opt-in basis, but Windows 8 only allows sideloading to be enabled if the device is running the Enterprise edition of Windows 8 on a domain. Sideloading on Windows RT, Windows 8 Pro, and on Windows 8 Enterprise computers without a domain affiliation, requires the purchase of additional licenses through volume licensing. Individual developers are able to register for US$19 and companies for US$99.

Initially, Microsoft took a 30% cut of app sales until it reached US$25,000 in revenue, after which the cut dropped to 20%. On January 1, 2015, the reduction in cut at $25,000 was removed, and Microsoft takes a 30% cut of all app purchases, regardless of overall sales. As of August 1, 2021, Microsoft takes a 12% cut of app sales. Third-party transactions are also allowed, of which Microsoft does not take a cut.

A range of multimedia content (music, books, movies) were formerly available on the Microsoft Store. They were gradually shut between 2017 to 2025, leaving only the apps & games storefront remaining.

=== Windows apps and games ===
In 2015, over 669,000 apps were available on the store, including apps for Windows NT, Windows Phone, and UWP apps, which work on both platforms. Categories containing the largest number of apps are "Games", "Entertainment", "Books and Reference", and "Education". The majority of the app developers have one app. Both free and paid apps can be distributed through Microsoft Store, with paid apps ranging in cost from US$0.99 to $999.99. Developers from 120 countries can submit apps to Microsoft Store. Apps may support any of 109 languages, as long as they support one of 12 app certification languages.

From 2016 to 2019, most Microsoft Studios games ported to PC were distributed exclusively via Microsoft Store. Microsoft later abandoned this strategy in May 2019, amid criticism of limitations faced by UWP-based games, and a desire to also sell games on competing storefronts such as Steam. The new Xbox app subsequently became the main frontend for PC games available via Microsoft Store, and also integrates subscription service PC Game Pass.

=== Former features ===
==== Music ====
On October 2, 2017, Microsoft announced that the sale of digital music on the Microsoft Store would cease on December 31 after the discontinuation of Groove Music Pass. Users were able to transfer their music to Spotify until January 31, 2018.

==== Books ====
Books bought from the Microsoft Store were formerly accessible on the EdgeHTML-based Microsoft Edge. The ability to open ePub e-books was removed during the shift to the Chromium-based Microsoft Edge.

On April 2, 2019, Microsoft announced that the sale of e-books on the Microsoft Store had ceased. Due to DRM licenses that would not be renewed, all books became inaccessible by July 2019, and Microsoft automatically refunded all users that had purchased books via the service.

==== Movies and TV shows ====
Movies and television shows were available for purchase or rental, depending on availability.

Content could be played on the Microsoft Movies & TV app (available for Windows 10, Xbox One, Xbox 360 and Xbox X/S), or Xbox Video app (available for Windows 8/RT PCs and tablets, and Windows Phone 8). In the United States, a Microsoft account can be linked to the Movies Anywhere digital locker service (separate registration required), which allows purchased content to be played on other platforms (e.g. MacOS, Android, iOS).

Microsoft Movies & TV was available in the following 21 countries: Australia, Austria, Belgium, Brazil, Canada, Denmark, Finland, France, Germany, Ireland, Italy, Japan, Mexico, Netherlands, New Zealand, Norway, Spain, Sweden, Switzerland, the United States, and the United Kingdom. The purchase of TV shows was not supported in Belgium.

On July 18, 2025, Microsoft announced the closure of its Movies & TV storefront after 12 years of operations. Users who live outside the US can continue to use the Movies & TV app to play previously purchased content until further notice. Microsoft recommended users who live in the US to use Movies Anywhere to sync their Microsoft-purchased content to other supported services such as Amazon Video or Apple TV.

== Guidelines and developers ==
Similar to Windows Phone Store, Microsoft Store is regulated by Microsoft. Applicants must obtain Microsoft's approval before their app becomes available on the store. These apps may not contain, support or approve, gratuitous profanity, obscenity, pornography, discrimination, defamation, or politically offensive content. They may also not contain contents that are forbidden by or offensive to the jurisdiction, religion or norms of the target market. They may also not encourage, facilitate or glamorize violence, drugs, tobacco, alcohol and weapons. Video game console emulators that are "primarily gaming experiences or target Xbox One" and third-party web browsers that use their own layout engines, are prohibited on Microsoft Store.

Microsoft has indicated that it can remotely disable or remove apps from end-user systems for security or legal reasons; in the case of paid apps, refunds may be issued when this is done.

Microsoft initially banned PEGI "18"-rated content from the store in Europe. However, critics noted that this made the content policies stricter than intended, as some PEGI 18-rated games are rated "Mature" on the U.S. ESRB system, which is the next lowest before its highest rating, "Adults Only". The guidelines were amended in December 2012 to remove the discrepancy.

On October 8, 2020, Microsoft announced a commitment to ten "principles" of fairness to developers in the operation of the Microsoft Store. These include transparency over its rules, practices, and Windows' "interoperability interfaces", not preventing competing application storefronts to run on Windows, charging developers "reasonable fees" and not "forc[ing]" them to include in-app purchases, allowing access to the store by any developer as long as their software meets "objective standards and requirements", not blocking apps based on their business model, how it delivers its services, or how it processes payments, not impeding developers from "communicating directly with their users through their apps for legitimate business purposes", not using private data from the store to influence the development of competing for software by Microsoft, and holding its own software to the same standards as others on the store. The announcement came in the wake of a lawsuits against Apple, Inc. and Google LLC by Epic Games over alleged anticompetitive practices conducted by their own application stores.

With the release of Windows 11, Microsoft announced that it would not require software (excluding games) distributed via Microsoft Store to use its own payment platforms, and that it will also allow third-party storefronts (such as Amazon Appstore—which will be used for its Android app support, and Epic Games Store) to offer their clients for download via Microsoft Store.

=== Developer tools ===
In addition to the user facing Microsoft Store client, the store also has a developer portal with which developers can interact. The Windows developer portal has the following sections for each app:

- App Summary - An overview page of a given app, including a downloads chart, quality chart, financial summary, and a sales chart.
- App Adoption - A page that shows adoption of the app, including conversions, referrers, and downloads.
- App Ratings - A ratings breakdown, as well as the ability to filter reviews by region.
- App Quality - An overview page showcasing exceptions that have occurred in the app.
- App Finance - A page where a developer can download all transactions related to their app.

Microsoft Store provides developer tools for tracking apps in the store.

The dashboard also presents a detailed breakdown of users by market, age, and region, as well as charts on the number of downloads, purchases, and average time spent in an app.

== Reception ==
Microsoft Store has widely received negative reviews since its inception. Unavailability of popular apps has been the leading reason for the cold reception of the store. In 2018, Phil Spencer, the then-head of Microsoft's gaming division, opined that Microsoft has "got a ton of work to do" in order to fix the Windows store for PC gamers. Malware had also made its way into the store by being displayed as popular games.

== See also ==
- List of Microsoft software
- Mac App Store, equivalent platform on macOS
