= Storage resource management =

In computing, storage resource management (SRM) involves optimizing the efficiency and speed with which a storage area network (SAN) utilizes available drive space.

== History ==
Data growth averages around 50% to 100% per year and organizations face rising hardware and storage management costs. Storage professionals who face out-of-control data growth are looking at SRM to help them navigate the storage environment. SRM identifies under-utilized capacity, identifies old or non-critical data that could be moved to less expensive storage, and helps predict future capacity requirements.

SRM evolved beyond quota management. As of 2012 it included functions such as storage area network (SAN) management.
