= Media player software =

Software that can play video and audio data

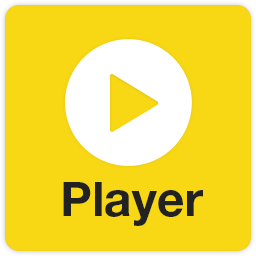
PotPlayer, an example of a cross-platform media player

Media player software is a type of application software for playing multimedia computer files like audio and video files. Media players commonly display standard media control icons known from physical devices such as tape recorders and CD players, such as play, pause, fastforward (⏩️), rewind (⏪), and stop buttons. In addition, they generally have progress bars (or "playback bars"), which are sliders to locate the current position in the duration of the media file.

Mainstream operating systems have at least one default media player. For example, Windows comes with Windows Media Player and its 2022 successor, while macOS comes with QuickTime Player and Apple Music. Linux distributions come with different media players, such as SMPlayer, Amarok, Audacious, Banshee, MPlayer, mpv, Rhythmbox, Totem, VLC media player, and xine. Android comes with YouTube Music for audio and Google Photos for video, and smartphone vendors such as Samsung may bundle custom software.

== Functionality focus ==
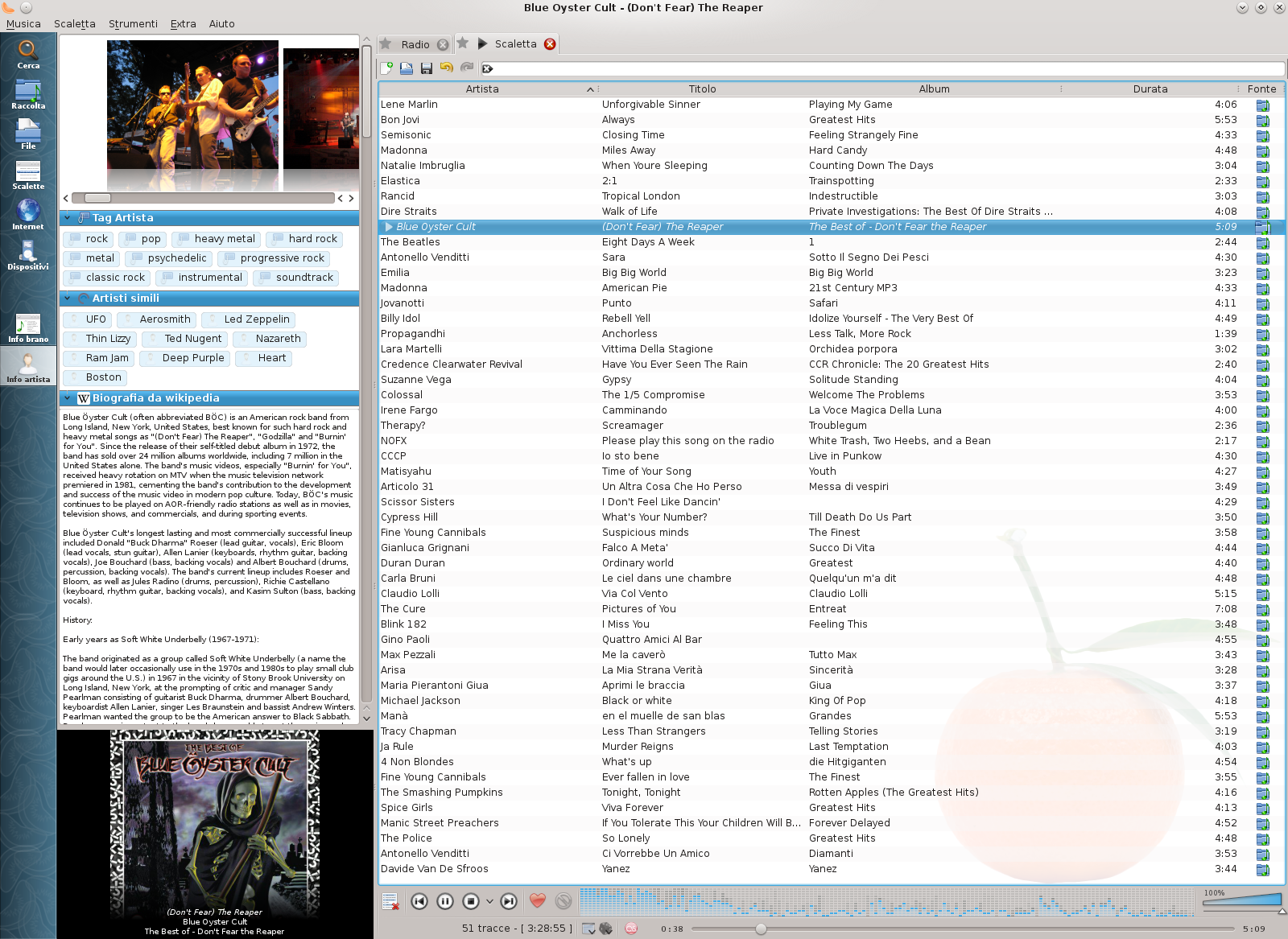
Clementine v1.2, an audio player with a media library and online radio

The basic feature set of media players are a seek bar, a timer with the current and total playback time, playback controls (play, pause, previous, next, stop), playlists, a "repeat" mode, and a "shuffle" (or "random") mode for curiosity and to facilitate searching long timelines of files.

Different media players have different goals and feature sets. Video players are a group of media players that have their features geared more towards playing digital video. For example, Windows DVD Player exclusively plays DVD-Video discs and nothing else. Media Player Classic can play individual audio and video files but many of its features such as color correction, picture sharpening, zooming, set of hotkeys, DVB support and subtitle support are only useful for video material such as films and cartoons. Audio players, on the other hand, specialize in digital audio. For example, AIMP exclusively plays audio formats. MediaMonkey can play both audio and video formats, but many of its features including media library, lyric discovery, music visualization, online radio, audiobook indexing, and tag editing are geared toward consumption of audio material; watching video files on it can be a trying feat. General-purpose media players also do exist. For example, Windows Media Player has exclusive features for both audio and video material, although it cannot match the feature set of Media Player Classic and MediaMonkey combined.

By default, videos are played with fully visible field of view while filling at least either width or height of the viewport to appear as large as possible. Options to change the video's scaling and aspect ratio may include filling the viewport through either stretching or cropping, and "100% view" where each pixel of the video covers exactly one pixel on the screen.

Zooming into the field of view during playback may be implemented through a slider on any screen or with pinch zoom on touch screens, and moving the field of view may be implemented through scrolling by dragging inside the view port or by moving a rectangle inside a miniature view of the entire field of view that denotes the magnified area.

Media player software may have the ability to adjust appearance and acoustics during playback using effects such as mirroring, rotating, cropping, cloning, adjusting colours, deinterlacing, and equalizing and visualizing audio. Easter eggs may be featured, such as a puzzle game on VLC Media Player.

Still snapshots may be extracted directly from a video frame or captured through a screenshot, the former of which is preferred since it preserves videos' original dimensions (height and width). Video players may show a tooltip bubble previewing footage at the position hovered over with the mouse cursor.

A preview tooltip for the seek bar has been implemented on few smartphones through a stylus or a self-capacitive touch screen able to detect a floating finger. Such include the Samsung Galaxy S4, S5 (finger), Note 2, Note 4 (stylus), and Note 3 (both).

Streaming media players may indicate buffered segments of the media in the seek bar. In addition to web player version that runs in the web browser, the streaming media provider (such as YouTube and Netflix) may offers proprietary app / software player version, and app / software player can offers better performance and better quality than web player.

=== 3D video players ===
3D video players are used to play 2D video in 3D format. A high-quality three-dimensional video presentation requires that each frame of a motion picture be embedded with information on the depth of objects present in the scene. This process involves shooting the video with special equipment from two distinct perspectives or modeling and rendering each frame as a collection of objects composed of 3D vertices and textures, much like in any modern video game, to achieve special effects. Tedious and costly, this method is only used in a small fraction of movies produced worldwide, while most movies remain in the form of traditional 2D images. It is, however, possible to give an otherwise two-dimensional picture the appearance of depth. Using a technique known as anaglyph processing a "flat" picture can be transformed so as to give an illusion of depth when viewed through anaglyph glasses (usually red-cyan). An image viewed through anaglyph glasses appears to have both protruding and deeply embedded objects in it, at the expense of somewhat distorted colors. The method itself is old enough, dating back to the mid-19th century, but it is only with recent advances in computer technology that it has become possible to apply this kind of transformation to a series of frames in a motion picture reasonably fast or even in real-time, i.e. as the video is being played back. Several implementations exist in the form of 3D video players that render conventional 2D video in anaglyph 3D, as well as in the form of 3D video converters that transform video into stereoscopic anaglyph and transcode it for playback with regular software or hardware video players.

== Examples ==
Well known examples of media player software include Windows Media Player, VLC media player, PotPlayer, iTunes, Winamp, Media Player Classic, MediaMonkey, foobar2000, AIMP, MusicBee, and JRiver Media Center. Most of these also include music library managers.

Although media players are often multi-media, they can be primarily designed for a specific media. For example, Media Player Classic and VLC media player are video-focused while Winamp and iTunes are music-focused, despite all of them supporting both types of media.

== Home theater PC ==
A home theater PC (HTPC) or media center computer is a convergent device that combines some or all the capabilities of a personal computer with a media center application that supports video, photo, audio playback, and sometimes video recording functionality. Although computers with some of these capabilities were available from the late 1980s, the "Home Theater PC" term first appeared in mainstream press in 1996. Since the mid-2000’s, other types of consumer electronics, including game consoles and digital media players have crossed over to manage video and music content. HTPCs are defined by their dedicated use for large screens like televisions or projectors, and their combination with media center applications, though said applications are also usually run on regular computers and digital media players.

== See also ==
- Comparison of video player software
- Comparison of audio player software
- Media center application
