= RealMedia =

Digital file format

- Filename extension: .rm, .rma, .rmi, .rmv, .rmvb, .rmhd, .rmm, .ra, .ram
- Internet media type: application/vnd.rn-realmedia
- Uniform Type Identifier (UTI): com.real.realmedia
- Developed by: RealNetworks
- Type of format: Container format
- Open format?: No
- Free format?: No

RealMedia is a proprietary multimedia container format created by RealNetworks with the filename extension .rm. RealMedia is used in conjunction with RealVideo and RealAudio, while also being used for streaming content over the Internet. Typically these streams are in CBR (constant bitrate), but a container for VBR (variable bitrate) streams named RMVB (RealMedia variable bitrate) has been developed.

== Overview ==
A RealMedia file consists of a series of chunks that can be of several different types:

- .RMF: RealMedia file header
- PROP: File properties header
- MDPR: Media properties header
- CONT: Content description header
- DATA: Data header
- INDX: Index header

=== Supported audio formats ===
- RealAudio 1.0 (VSELP), IpcJ
- RealAudio 2.0 (LD-CELP), 28_8
- AC3, dnet
- Sipro, sipr
- cook, cook
- ATRAC3, atrc
- RealAudio Lossless Format, ralf
- LC-AAC, raac
- HE-AAC, racp

=== Supported video formats ===
- ClearVideo (from helix spec)
- H.263, RV10
- H.263, RV13
- H.263+, RV20
- H.264 precursor, RV30
- H.264 precursor, RV40
- H.263+ (RV20), RVTR
- H.265, RMHD

== See also ==
- RealPlayer
- Container format
- Comparison of video container formats
- Comparison of video player software
- RealVideo codecs
- RealAudio codecs
- Helix Community - the free and open source software project from RealNetworks
