= Xing Technology =

American software company

- Industry: Software
- Founded: 1989; 37 years ago in Arroyo Grande, California, United States
- Founder: Howard Gordon
- Defunct: 1999
- Fate: Acquired by RealNetwork
- Key people: Chris Eddy
- Products: XingIt!; Picture Prowler; StreamWorks; Audio Catalyst; MP3 Grabber

Xing Technology was a live audio broadcast software company founded in Arroyo Grande, California in 1989 by former networking executive Howard Gordon.

== History ==
Gordon founded Xing on the basis of a simple JPEG decoding library that he had developed. It attracted the attention of Chris Eddy, who had developed a technique for processing Discrete cosine transforms (DCT) efficiently through software. Eddy's technique helped create the first Xing MPEG video player, a very simple MS-DOS app that could play an I-frame-only MPEG video stream encoded with constant quantization, at 160x120 resolution.

Over the next years, Xing expanded in several directions: Windows support for the XingMPEG player, a software MPEG audio decoder, a real-time ISA 160x120 MPEG capture board (XingIt!), a JPEG management system (Picture Prowler), and networking. Xing released a handful of network products before StreamWorks, the first streaming audio and video system for the Internet, with support for both live and pre-encoded sources. RealVideo appeared in 1997 (just before StreamWorks), but at the time, the company behind the technology (Progressive Networks) had only published RealAudio and its flagship technology was primary for broadcasting audio.

After the launch of StreamWorks, the company raised $5M in venture capital, but Progressive Networks (which was renamed "RealNetworks") raised considerably more in its initial public offering and acquired many of Xing's competitors (e.g. Vivo Software). Despite that, Xing experienced a period of expansion through its "Audio Catalyst" MP3 software and "MP3 Grabber".

In 1998, Xing partnered with SimplyTV to launch a service to offer near-broadcast quality video on demand. This service would require a 200 kilobits/s broadband connection, which was not popular at that time. Forrester Research and RealNetwork were skeptical about its success.

In 1999, RealNetwork acquired Xing.
