= RealVideo =

Video compression formats

- Internet media type: video/x-pn-realvideo
- Developed by: RealNetworks
- Initial release: February 1997; 29 years ago
- Type of format: Video coding format
- Open format?: No
- Free format?: No
- Website: Product Website at the Wayback Machine (archived May 31, 2009)

RealVideo, also spelled as Real Video, is a suite of proprietary video compression formats developed by RealNetworks — the specific format changes with the version. It was first released in 1997 and as of 2024 was at version 15. RealVideo is supported on many platforms, including Windows, Mac, Linux, Solaris, and several mobile phones.

RealVideo is usually paired with RealAudio and packaged in a RealMedia (.rm) container. RealMedia is suitable for use as a streaming media format, that one is viewed while it is being sent over the network. Streaming video can be used to watch live television since it does not require downloading the entire video in advance.

== Technology ==
The first version of RealVideo was announced in 1997 and was based on the H.263 format. At the time, RealNetworks issued a press release saying they had licensed Iterated Systems' ClearVideo technology and were including it as the RealVideo Fractal Codec. However, support for ClearVideo quietly disappeared in the next version of RealVideo.

RealVideo continued to use H.263 until RealVideo 8 when the company switched to a proprietary video format. RealVideo codecs are identified by four-character codes. RV10 and RV20 are the H.263-based codecs. RV30 and RV40 are RealNetworks' proprietary H.264-based codecs. These identifiers have been the source of some confusion, as people may assume that RV10 is RealVideo version 10 when it is the first version of RealVideo. RealVideo 10 uses RV40.

RealVideo can be played from a RealMedia file or streamed over the network using the Real Time Streaming Protocol (RTSP), a standard protocol for streaming media developed by the IETF. However, RealNetworks uses RTSP only to set up and manage the connection. The actual video data is sent with their own proprietary Real Data Transport (RDT) protocol. This tactic has drawn criticism because it made it difficult to use RealVideo with other player and server software. However, the open-source MPlayer project has now developed software capable of playing the RDT streams.

To facilitate real-time streaming, RealVideo (and RealAudio) normally uses constant bit rate encoding, so that the same amount of data is sent over the network each second. Recently, RealNetworks has introduced a variable bit rate form called RealMedia Variable Bitrate (RMVB). This allows for better video quality, however, this format is less suited for streaming because it is difficult to predict how much network capacity a certain video stream will need. Video with fast motion or rapidly changing scenes will require a higher bit rate. If the bit rate of a video stream increases significantly, it may exceed the speed at which data can be transmitted over the network, leading to an interruption in the video.

RealNetworks says that the RealVideo and RealAudio codecs are not available in source code under the RPSL license. Source code is available only under RCSL license for commercial porting to non-supported processors and operating systems. While RealNetworks owns most of the intellectual property for RealVideo and RealAudio, RealNetworks has licensed third-party technology for certain aspects of those codecs. RealNetworks claims that it does not have the right to license that technology under an open-source license.

== RealVideo Players ==
The official player for RealVideo is RealNetworks RealPlayer SP, currently at version 15, and is available for various platforms including Windows, Macintosh, and Linux. Several other players exist, including MPlayer and Media Player Classic. Many of these rely on the dynamically linked libraries (DLLs) from the official RealPlayer to play the video, and thus require RealPlayer to be installed (or at least its DLLs, if not the actual player). However, FFmpeg's libav* libraries (and its DirectShow counterpart ffdshow) can play RealVideo and do not require RealPlayer or any parts thereof.

The latest version of RealPlayer that can run on Windows 9x is RealPlayer 8; but this version can be easily modified to play RealPlayer 9 and 10 files, by the manual addition of just three .dll files (codecs and plugins), from Microsoft's free distribution of RealPlayer 10, that are not included in RealPlayer 8 Basic.

RealNetworks has also developed the open-source Helix player, however support for RealVideo in the Helix Project is limited because RealNetworks is still keeping the codecs proprietary.

RealPlayer does not record RealVideo streams, and RealNetworks has advertised this feature to content owners such as broadcasters, film studios, and music labels, as a means of discouraging users from copying video. However, other software exists which can save the streams to files for later viewing. Such copying, known as time-shifting, is legal in most countries.

== Video compression formats and codec versions ==
RealVideo files are compressed using several different video compression formats. Each video compression format is identified by a four-character code. Below is a list of the video compression formats and the version in which each was introduced:

=== RV10 ===
- rv10, rv13: RealVideo 1.0, based on H.263 (included with RealPlayer 5)

=== RV20 ===
- rv20: RealVideo G2 and RealVideo G2+SVT, also based on h.263 (included with RealPlayer 6). SVT (Scalable Video Technology) is a feature that allows for decoding at a lower framerate (frame-skipping) on low-end machines.

=== RV30 ===
- rv30: RealVideo 3, suspected to be based largely on an early draft of H.264 (included with RealPlayer 8)

=== RV40 ===
- rv40: RealVideo 4, suspected to be based on H.264 (included with RealPlayer 9)
- rv40: RealVideo 4, aka RV9 EHQ (included with RealPlayer 10). This refers to an improved encoder for the RV9 format that is fully backward compatible with RV9 players – the format and decoder did not change, only the encoder did. As a result, it uses the same FourCC.

=== RV60 ===
- rv60: RealMedia HD (RealVideo 11), suspected to be based on HEVC (included with RealPlayer 18). In April 2018, RealNetworks posted test results of encoder speed and compression efficiency. Their tests compared RealMedia HD to HEVC, H.264, and VP9 encoders. Results claimed RealMedia HD provided higher compression than HEVC at higher perceived quality levels. RealMedia HD was also purportedly faster than x265 and VP9 at comparable complexity settings.

The newest version of RealPlayer can play any RealVideo file, as can programs using FFmpeg. Other programs may not support all video compression formats. In addition to decoder code for up to RV50, FFmpeg also contains open-source code for RV10 and RV20 encoders.

== See also ==
- RealAudio
- RealNetworks
- Video coding format
- Comparison of video codecs
