= RCSL =

RCSL may mean:

- RealNetworks Community Source License, a software license
- Rugby Canada Super League, a rugby union competition in Canada
- Red Costarricense de Software Libre, a Costa Rican Free Software advocacy group
- Royal Standard de Liège, a Belgian soccer club from the city of Liège.
