= RealNetworks, Inc. v. Streambox, Inc. =

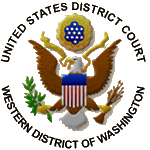
- Court: United States District Court for the Western District of Washington
- Full case name: RealNetworks, Inc. v. Streambox, Inc.
- Decided: January 18, 2000
- Citation: 2000 WL 127311; 2000 U.S. Dist. LEXIS 1889

Holding
- Providing a service that enables users to circumvent a copyright control mechanism is a violation of the Digital Millennium Copyright Act.

Court membership
- Judge sitting: Marsha J. Pechman

Laws applied
- Digital Millennium Copyright Act

RealNetworks, Inc. v. Streambox, Inc., 2000 WL 127311 (W.D. Wash., 2000), was a copyright law case of the United States District Court for the Western District of Washington, over the anti-circumvention provisions of the Digital Millennium Copyright Act and whether those provisions are violated by a service that enables Internet users to circumvent the copyright protection controls used by a streaming platform.

== Background ==
RealNetworks was an early innovator in streaming media, and in the late 1990s developed a paid service that allowed users to stream copyrighted audio and video files with the authorization of the copyright owners; the users would not be able to make copies of the audio and video data. RealNetworks used proprietary formats, including .rm ("RealMedia") for audio files, that were intended to be difficult to copy as the audio streamed by.

Streambox was an audio/video company that responded to consumer demand for the ability to capture streaming media, like that available from the RealNetworks service, and to save the resulting files on one's own computer to be played on other devices. Streambox developed a product called the Streambox VCR that allowed users to copy .rm and other proprietary file types that were stored on RealNetworks servers. Streambox offered another product called the Ripper that converted the captured files from the RealNetworks proprietary formats into more easily used file types including .wav and .mp3. Streambox also offered a product called the Ferret that added a user interface to the RealNetworks platform, enabling users to manipulate the RealNetworks streams in various ways.

RealNetworks claimed that its own service was intended to serve as a copyright protection control for the owners of music and video copyrights, and that the Streambox products circumvented that protection mechanism in violation of the Digital Millennium Copyright Act. RealNetworks also claimed that its own copyrights had been infringed because Streambox's services illegally altered its software. RealNetworks filed suit in the District Court for the Western District of Washington and sought a preliminary injunction to prohibit the distribution and use of Streambox's VCR, Ripper, and Ferret products.

== Opinion ==
During the proceedings at the district court, Streambox attempted a fair use defense by claiming that its products simply enabled RealNetworks users to play files at their leisure, comparing this practice to the time-shifting of broadcast TV media that is permitted per the 1984 Supreme Court precedent Sony Corp. of America v. Universal City Studios, Inc. The court rejected this argument because the Digital Millennium Copyright Act had been enacted in the meantime, while the technology at issue in the Sony case (video cassette recorders) did not circumvent someone else's copyright protection mechanisms.

The court found that the Streambox VCR product was a violation of the anti-circumvention provisions of the Digital Millennium Copyright Act, because it captured files that had been designed as copy-proof streaming media, and was "primarily, if not exclusively, designed to circumvent the access control and copy protection measures that RealNetworks affords to copyright owners." The VCR was also found to circumvent a RealNetworks protocol called "Secret Handshake" that intended to verify and authenticate use by approved RealNetworks customers.

The court also ruled that the Streambox Ferret product, by acting as a plug-in that its own customers could attach to RealNetworks' proprietary software, was a violation of the copyright protection enjoyed by RealNetworks for its own software design. This was found to be an alteration that did not qualify as transformative use under the fair use defense for copyright infringement. However, RealNetworks was unable to claim that it had suffered harm from the Streambox Ripper product, which the court found to be a file management system that operated on the user's computer and did not interact with the RealNetworks platform.

Thus, the court granted RealNetworks' motion for preliminary injunctions against the VCR and Ferret products offered by Streambox, but not the Ripper product. While Streambox was not responsible for contributing to the copyright infringement committed by its users, per the Digital Millennium Copyright Act it had engaged in prohibited circumvention of a different company's copyright control mechanisms.

== Impact ==
RealNetworks, Inc. v. Streambox, Inc. has been cited as an important precedent on the functions of the anti-circumvention provisions of the Digital Millennium Copyright Act, but with some criticism of how it favored copyright owners at the expense of new technological innovations that could benefit the general public. The ruling was cited as a precedent in several later high-profile cases on Internet-enabled sharing of copyrighted entertainment files, though some commentators have found that the specific technological issues of the case have been applied awkwardly to later file-sharing technologies, confusing the differences between downloading and streaming.
