= RealPlayer =

Media player app

- RealPlayer 22 on Windows
- Other names: RealAudio Player; RealPlayer G2; RealOne Player
- Developer: RealNetworks
- Release: April 3, 1995; 31 years ago
- Stable release: Windows: 25.0.2.304 (July 8, 2026; 4 months ago) [±] OS X: 12.0.1.1750 (September 7, 2012; 14 years ago) [±] Windows Mobile: 1.1 (July 30, 2009; 17 years ago) [±] Android: 1.61 (October 23, 2024; 2 years ago) [±]
- Preview release: 16.0 (TBA) [±]
- Operating system: Windows, macOS, Linux, Solaris, Android, BeOS, Symbian, and Palm OS
- Platform: IA-32, x86-64, ARM and MIPS
- Available in: English, Chinese (Simplified and Traditional), German, French, Korean, Italian, Japanese, and Portuguese
- Type: Media player
- License: Freemium
- Website: www.real.com/realplayer

RealPlayer, formerly RealAudio Player, RealOne Player and RealPlayer G2, is a cross-platform media player app, developed by RealNetworks. The media player is compatible with numerous container file formats of the multimedia realm, including MP3, MP4, QuickTime File Format, Windows Media format, and the proprietary RealAudio and RealVideo formats. RealPlayer is also available for other operating systems; Linux, Unix, Palm OS, Windows Mobile, and Symbian versions have been released.

The program is powered by an underlying open-source media engine called Helix.

== History ==
The first version of RealPlayer was introduced on April 3, 1995 as "RealAudio Player" and was one of the first media players capable of streaming media over the Internet. Then, version 4.01 of RealPlayer was included as a selectable Internet tool in Windows 98's installation package. Subsequent versions of the software were titled "RealPlayer G2" (version 6) and "RealOne Player" (version 9), while free "Basic" versions as well as paid "Plus" versions, the latter with additional features, have also been offered. For the Windows OS, the RealPlayer version 9 subsumed the features of the separate program, RealJukebox. As of October 2001, it had thirty million users in Europe alone.

On December 4, 2001, the result of the merger between RealPlayer and RealJukebox led to the creation of a new brand, RealOne Player. The new name led to RealOne supporting more than 50 video formats. A second version was released in September 2002.

In July 2008, the RealPlayer Music Store was replaced with the Rhapsody MP3 Store.

RealPlayer 11 was released for Microsoft Windows in November 2007 and for Mac OS X in May 2008. RealPlayer 15 was released on November 18, 2011. This version allowed users to transfer video, music, and photos between their computers and mobile devices, share links of videos and photos on sites such as Facebook and MySpace, and download videos from popular sites such as YouTube and Metacafe.

RealPlayer was initially a common plugin used to play streaming video or audio (for example, most of the BBC's websites formerly employed the plugin); but in the mid 2000s, Adobe Flash and subsequently HTML video became preferred options for this purpose.

== Current status ==
In February 2016, RealNetworks released RealPlayer 18, which incorporated the features of the previous year's release of RealTimes, an app that makes multimedia montages from users' photographs and videos, backed up and accessible via cloud storage. The Real.com Blog states that "RealPlayer with RealTimes (aka "RealPlayer" for short) will still include the legacy features, such as Downloader, Converter, and Web Videos. It will also still include our RealTimes features, such as Photos and RealTimes Stories, our automatic video collage feature." Note that as of 2018, the publisher only provides RealTime for use on a Mac and no longer publishes a media player called RealPlayer for macOS.

As of January 2022, the www.real.com home page offers RealPlayer for Windows, Android, and iOS.

== Features ==
Features of RealPlayer include a video download utility, a web browser, visualizations (graphical animations or "light shows" that appear on the screen when playing music), equalizer and video controls (including Crossfade and Gapless playback in RealPlayer Plus), recording audio, CD ripping, and a media converter which allows converting files to a variety of common audio and video formats.

- Photo and Video Sharing - users can post videos to Facebook and Twitter directly from the software, as well as share directly to friends and family via email or SMS messages.

=== Supported media formats ===
RealPlayer has used several data formats:

- RealMedia formats: RealAudio (*.ra, *.rm), RealVideo (*.rv, *.rm, *.rmvb), RealMedia HD (*.rmhd), RealPix (*.rp), RealText (*.rt), RealMedia Shortcut (*.ram, *.rmm)
- Streaming: RealTime Streaming Protocol (rtsp://), Progressive Networks Streaming Protocols (pna://, pnm://), Microsoft Windows Media Streaming Protocol (mms://), Real Scalable Multicast (*.sdp), Synchronized Multimedia Integration Language (*.smil, *.smi)
- Audio: MP3 (*.mp3, *.mp2, *.mp2, *.m3u), CD Audio (*.cda), WAV (*.wav), AAC/aacPlus v1 (*.aac, *.m4a, *.m4b, *.mp4, *.acp, *.m4p), Apple Lossless, AIFF (*.aif, *.aiff), AU Audio Files (*.au), Panasonic AAC (*.acp)
- Video: DVD (*.vob), Video CD (*.dat), MPEG Video (*.mpg, *.mpeg, *.m2v, *.mpe etc.), AVI (*.avi, *.divx), MJPEG video playback from .avi files, Windows Media (*.wma, *.wmv etc.) (requires Windows Media Player 9/10), QuickTime (*.mov, *.qt) (QuickTime Player must be installed), Adobe Systems Flash (*.swf) (Flash or Shockwave Player must be installed), Flash Video (*.flv), Internet Video Recording (*.ivr).
- Playlists (*.rpl, *.xpl, *.pls, *.m3u)
- Graphics: Bitmap (*.bmp), GIF Images (*.gif), JPEG Images (*.jpeg, *.jpg), PNG (*.png)

=== Formats supported by optional plug-ins ===
- AT&T A2B (*.a2b, *.mes)
- Adobe Systems SVG (*.svg)
- Audible Audio (*.aa)
- Object Video (*.obv)
- Luidia eBeam (*.wbs)
- Digital Bitcasting
- Envivio (*.mp4)
- EVEN Technologies PSI Video (*.psi, *.fxv)
- LearnKey RealCBT (*.lkv)
- Liquid Audio (*.la, *.lmsff, .lqt, .lavs, .lar, .la1)
- Netpodium Quickcast Image (*.npi)
- LiveUpdate! Streaming MIDI files (*.mid, *.midi, *.rmi)
- Camtasia Video (*.camv)
- Ogg Vorbis/Theora (*.ogg, *.ogm)
- RichFX (*.vpg, *.wgs)
- Mode2 CDs
- MIMIO Broadcast (*.mbc)
- BeHere iVideo 360° Movies (*.bhiv)
- iPIX 360° Movies (*.ipx)
- ScreenWatch (*.scw)
- Vivo Video Files (*.viv)
- MJuice Files (*.mjf)
- Blue Matter (*.bmt, *.bma)
- OZ.COM fluid3d
- IBM EMMS (*.emm)
- On2 VP5 (*.vp5)
- On2 VP4 (*.vp4)
- On2 VP3 (*.vp3)
- ImagePower Motion JPEG2000 (*.jp2, *.avi)
- 3GP Mobile Phone Video Files (3gp)
- AMR Narrow Band (*.amr)
- AMR Wide Band (*.amr)

=== Plug-ins ===
RealPlayer has a wide variety of plug-ins. Some of the plug-ins are listed at the RealPlayer accessories page, but not all.

Audio Enhancement
There are four audio "enhancers" available for the latest version of RealPlayer. DFX, iQfx, Volume Logic, and Sanyo 3D Surround. Lake PLS, created by Lake Technologies, works only with RealJukebox, and has limited use. There are some registry tweaks which allow Lake PLS to work with RealPlayer 10. Lake PLS is still available on the RealPlayer website.
RealPlayer Skin Creators
RealPlayer has had two skin creator plug-ins: SkinsEditor for RealJukebox -- an easy-to-use skins creator made by DeYoung software. The second application, RealJukebox Skins Converter, converts Winamp skins into RealPlayer skins.
Playback Plug-Ins
Please see section Formats supported by optional plug-ins
vTuner Plus is a radio tuner specially created for RealPlayer.
Visualizations

- Annabelle the Sheep
- Cosmic Belt
- Fire
- Audio Analyzer
- Nebula

The available visualizations from the RealNetworks site are: FrequencywurX, FyrewurX, FlamewurX, X Factor, Spectral View, FluxWave, Puddle, Paint Drops, Polka Dots, SticksterZ 1.0, Circle, TomTom On the Road, Real Logo, and Hubble Bubble. There are some more visualization plug-ins like SurrealFX by RealNetworks, G-Force and WhiteCap by SoundSpectrum and SticksterZ 1.1 by Eric Metois.

Firefox Browser Download (Firefox Add-on)
RealPlayer has a browser download add-on for Firefox (currently v1.0) which allows users to download video from a video player window (pop-up menu above top-right side of video player).
ScrobRealPlayer
an audioscrobbler plugin that connects RealPlayer with the Last.FM social music network.

== Supported platforms for RealPlayer ==
=== Windows ===
RealPlayer SP includes audio CD burning capabilities, DVR-style playback buffering, multimedia search, Internet radio, a jukebox-style file library, an embedded web browser (using Microsoft Internet Explorer), and the ability to convert and transfer media to a wide range of devices. This includes music players such as iPod and Zune, smartphones such as iPhone and BlackBerry, portable gaming devices such as Sony PSP, and console gaming systems such as Xbox 360, PS3, and Wii. Since version 11, RealPlayer SP has gained Flash Video support, DVD, SVCD, VCD burning (120-minute), and video recording (DRM is supported).

As of 2008, RealPlayer Enterprise is a licensed product for enterprise applications which can be customized and remotely administered by RealPlayer Enterprise Manager. The free Realplayer Enterprise Education Edition has been removed. Both versions of Realplayer Enterprise are lightweight, ad-free versions of RealPlayer, missing most consumer features and most plug-in support. The RealSched.exe update reminder can be disabled in two steps, and it is not reinstalled upon running the player.

=== macOS ===
While RealPlayer for macOS had been distributed (for free) in the past, as of December 2018 no macOS version of RealPlayer is available for download from the Real site.

The last stable release as of July 2010 included Real's Helix playback engine for RealAudio and RealVideo, a 10-band equalizer and video adjustment controls, and a full-screen, resizable "theater mode" for video playback, as well as many features found in its Windows counterpart.

Since the release of version 10 on January 7, 2004, RealPlayer had become much more closely integrated with macOS including features such as:

- QuickTime playback support (including full-screen viewing which Apple only introduced to its own basic QuickTime Player in 2007)
- An integrated Web browser based on Apple's WebKit framework, resulting in RealPlayer and Safari sharing cookies.
- Support for Bonjour to share Internet favorites.
- Cocoa user interface.

All available versions of RealPlayer for macOS are 32-bit, thus the program can only run up to macOS Mojave due to 32-bit app support being dropped in Catalina.

=== Linux/Unix ===
RealPlayer for Linux/Unix was developed separately from the Windows and Mac versions. The client is based on the open-source Helix Player which can be found at the Helix Community Website. It supports Windows Media 7/8, RealAudio/Video, MP3 and Ogg Vorbis. The interface depends on the current GTK+ theme.

=== Android ===
The Android version of RealPlayer is currently available as a free download from the Google Play Store. It supports Real Audio, Real Video, MP3, 3GP, AMR, and other media formats.

=== Symbian ===
The Symbian version of RealPlayer allows mobile phones to play Real Audio, Real Video, MP3, 3GP, AMR, and other media formats. It is provided as freeware. In newer Symbian devices it can also be used to stream both audio and video content in the form of MP3 (music) and 3GP (videos).

=== Palm ===
RealPlayer 1.6.1 (US) or RealPlayer 1.6.0 (worldwide) is available for free for PalmOne-made Palm OS 5 devices, such as the Palm Tungsten or Zire series. It is also compatible with RealPlayer Music Store tracks. However, they will neither install nor run on non-PalmOne-made devices like Sony's Clie line of PDAs. Realplayer for Palm OS does not support later Palm smartphones such as the treo 700p, 755p, or Centro, although the treo 600 and 650 are listed as supported devices.

== Related products ==
RealJukebox was a media player that allowed users to play and manage their digital music on hard drives, CDs and online. It was first released in May 1999. By late 2001, the functions of RealJukebox, RealPlayer and GoldPass (a subscription webcast service) had been integrated into Real's newly released all-in-one media player, RealOne Player.

== Reception ==
Past versions of RealPlayer have been criticized for containing adware and spyware such as Comet Cursor. In 1999 security researcher Richard M. Smith dissected some of RealJukebox's network traffic and discovered that it was sending a unique identifier with information about the music titles to which its users were listening. RealNetworks issued a patch, and the spyware was removed in version 1.02. Their download page stated RealJukebox included privacy enhancements and supplied the link to their updated privacy policy.

PC World magazine named RealPlayer (1999 Version) as number 2 in its 2006 list "The 25 Worst Tech Products of All Time", writing that RealPlayer "had a disturbing way of making itself a little too much at home on your PC--installing itself as the default media player, taking liberties with your Windows Registry, popping up annoying 'messages' that were really just advertisements, and so on." In 2007, it placed RealPlayer, versions 1996–2004, at number 5 in its list The 20 Most Annoying Tech Products.

US-CERT has issued multiple security advisories reporting defects which allowed remote sites to use RealPlayer to execute attack code.

== Real Alternative ==
Real Alternative is a codec that enables 3rd-party media players to play RealMedia files without RealPlayer. In 2010, RealNetworks sued Hilbrand Edskes, a 26-year-old Dutch webmaster, for providing a hyperlink to the Real Alternative codec on his website, alleging that Real Alternative is a copyright violation of RealPlayer. In November 2011, RealNetworks' case against Edskes was dismissed and RealNetworks was ordered to pay him €48,000 in damages. The case, however, cost Edskes €66,000 in legal fees.

RealNetworks announced the intention to appeal the case in 2013, based on previously sealed case evidence. According to RealNetworks, logs taken from Edskes' computer show that Edskes was involved in uploading Real Alternative to his server. Thus, the company alleges that Edskes actively propagated the copyright-infringing codec and goes so far as to say that Edskes had a hand in creating it. Edskes, however, counters that these uploads are the work of an automated script that measured the size and checksum of Real Alternative for display on his website. In reality, the .htaccess file on his server prevented third parties from seeing and downloading Real Alternative from his server. As of 2026, an appeal court has not materialized.

== See also ==
- Comparison of video player software
- RealAudio
- RealVideo
- RealMedia
