= RealJukebox =

Digital music organizer

RealJukebox was a computer program released by RealNetworks that allowed users to organise their digital music. It was first released in May 1999. By late 2001 the functionality of the program had been integrated into the Real's core media player program, RealPlayer.

== Versions ==
RealJukebox came in two flavors: basic and Plus. The basic player had the ability to rip music, but its ability was limited to 96 kbit/s for MP3 Music. It also disabled several features such as advanced automatic playlists, crossfading, format conversion, jewel case label printing, equalizer functionality, and had a limitation on the number of discs that could be burned.

The program did display advertising and has the ability to be removed if one pays a registration fee to remove the advertising and other program limitations.
