= Starlight Networks =

Starlight Networks was founded in 1991 by Charlie Bass, Jim Long and Mark Gang with backing from investors Accel Partners and Interwest Partners. The company created some of the first commercial video-on-demand and video streaming products. The first Starlight Networks product was named StarWorks and enabled on-demand MPEG1 full motion videos to be randomly accessed on corporate IP networks. Later a version was released for Novell named Starware.

Originally, the press to networked video as "store & forward video" but that changed after Starlight Networks began describing it as "streaming video". In late 1996 as Starlight added support for live presentations integrating live streaming video with slides and chat, they referred to such solutions as "InterMedia Networking". The 'live' streaming product was named StarLive.

In 1995, Starlight introduced streaming video over satellites with Hughes Network Systems. In February 1998 Starlight introduced one of the first full motion video Web conferencing products, StarLive! (the exclamation point was part of the product name). Technology analyst Om Malik wrote in May 1998 how Starlight software helped power Bloomberg Television and Starlight partnered with RealNetworks to enable Web conferencing at Smith Barney. General Electric also tapped Starlight Products for corporate communications and training. Starlight streaming VOD products were also used for media applications such as powering all the video kiosks in the brand new at the time Cleveland Rock N' Roll Hall of Fame or Universal Studios using a networked Starlight video server to serve up 'dailies' to employees rather than using video-tapes copied for all and distributed manually.

Other investors included: Sequoia Capital, and Merrill, Pickard, Anderson, and Eyre Ventures. Starlight was acquired by PictureTel Corp. in 1998.

Website: https://StarlightNetworks.net
