= Colleen Moffitt =

American businesswoman and author (born 1969)

Colleen Moffit (born October 28, 1969) is an American businesswoman and author. She is the co-founder of Communiqué PR, a public relations firm and the co-author of Strategic Public Relations: 10 Principles to Harness the Power of PR.

== Early life and education ==
Moffitt graduated from University of Puget Sound bachelor's degree in Psychology and a minor in Business in 1991.

== Career ==
Before co-founding Communiqué PR, Moffitt worked for RealNetworks and Microsoft.

== Book ==
- Strategic Public Relations: 10 Principles to Harness the Power of PR (Xlibris, 2010), ISBN 978-1436387248
