= Lisa Gelobter =

American computer scientist and technologist (born 1971)

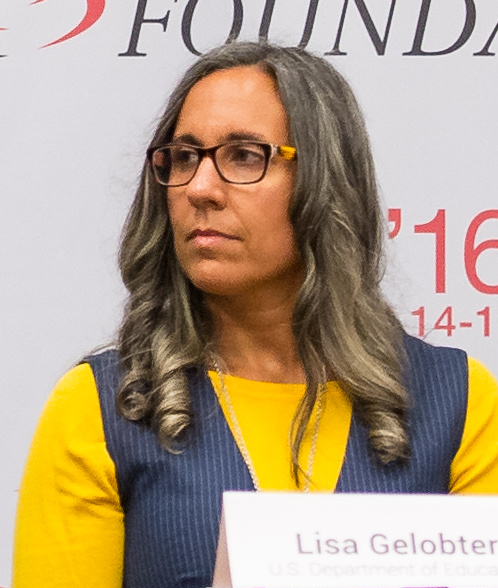
- Gelobter at a panel hosted by NASA in 2016
- Born: 1971 (age 54–55)
- Education: Brown University
- Occupations: Founder and CEO of tEQuitable
- Employer: tEQuitable United States Department of Education Black Entertainment Television Macromedia
- Notable work: Macromedia Shockwave software

Lisa Gelobter (born 1971) is a computer scientist, technologist and chief executive.

She was announced as the incoming Chief Technology Officer for the City of New York and Commissioner of the Office of Technology and Innovation by Mayor Zohran Mamdani in February 2026.

Gelobter served as the Chief Digital Service Officer for the United States Department of Education during President Barack Obama's administration.

In 2016, Gelobter founded and took on the role of Chief Executive Officer of tEQuitable, a start-up that provides an independent and confidential platform to address issues of bias, harassment, and discrimination in the workplace. Earlier in her career, she worked at Macromedia on the Shockwave platform, which was influential in bringing animation and motion to the web.

Gelobter has been involved in many social activism and political campaigns. She has worked with Black Girls Code and the Kapor Center for Social Impact in efforts to address issues of racism and bias in the technology industry.

== Personal life ==
Gelobter was born in 1971 in Washington, D.C. and grew up in New York City. Her father was a Polish Jew, and her mother was Afro-Caribbean. Gelobter expressed an interest in mathematics from a very early age. Although her family faced financial challenges, her father, a campaign manager for Shirley Chisholm, encouraged her to attend higher education.

Gelobter enrolled in Brown University in 1987, eventually graduating in 2011 with a Bachelor of Science in Computer Science with a concentration in artificial intelligence and machine learning. Gelobter often took breaks from college due to financial challenges, and she worked as a Teaching Assistant (TA), even when she wasn’t fully enrolled. Gelobter later went on to pursue a Master of Fine Arts in Film from the New York University Tisch School of the Arts.

== Career ==
Early in her career, Gelobter was the Director of Program Management at Macromedia. During her time there, she led the development of Shockwave, a multimedia platform that laid the foundation for the modern web. Shockwave is a platform that supports raster graphics, vector graphics, and 3D graphics, addressing the lack of rich web interactivity at the time. A similar technology contributing to further interest in animation on the web, the Animated GIF image format, also increased in popularity at the time with support from Netscape Navigator's inclusion of looping capabilities, but Gelobter did not create the GIF format. Shockwave transformed the internet and revolutionized the animation industry, with Gelobter’s invention largely influencing subsequent technologies, like Flash and HTML5.

After Macromedia, she held several executive-level positions at companies like The Feedroom, Comet Systems, Brightcove, Joost Technologies, and NBC Universal, and a senior management position for the launch of Hulu. From there Gelobter spent several years as the Chief Digital Officer for BET Networks.

In 2015, Gelobter served as Chief Digital Service Officer for the United States Department of Education during the Presidency of Barack Obama. In this position, she helped to improve HealthCare.gov, helping to streamline the application process. She led the team that built the College Scorecard, an online tool for comparing the cost and value of higher education institutions in the United States. College Scorecard changed the focus of higher education budgets from new buildings and sports to increasing access, affordability, and outcomes. This program helped raise the country’s college graduation rates by 1.5%.

In 2016, Gelobter founded tEQuitable, a technology platform to address issues of bias, discrimination and harassment in the workplace. tEQuitable provides confidential, off-the-record resources for employees to resolve workplace conflicts. Workplace issues can be identified and resolved early before escalation. Gelobter raised more than $2 million for tEQuitable, becoming one of the only thirty-four Black women to ever raise $1 million or more in venture capital.

In February 2026, Mayor Zohran Mamdani announced her hiring as the new Chief Technology Officer for the City of New York and Commissioner of the Office of Technology and Innovation.

== Honors and awards ==
- In 2019, her and her business tEQuitable are recognized in Inc.'s 100 Women Building America's Most Innovative and Ambitious Businesses.
- In January 2016, she is recognized as one of the Most Creative People in Business by Fast Company.
- In March 2014, she is honored by an article in The Roots called "17 Black Women in Science and Tech You Should Know".
- In November 2011 she was recognized in The Roots' article "Blacks in Silicon Valley".
