= Picture Prowler =

- Original authors: Ray Bunnage; Howard Gordon; Chris Eddy
- Developer: Xing Technology's
- Release: 1993; 33 years ago
- Type: photo management

Picture Prowler was an early piece of photo management software developed around and meant to show off Xing Technology's JPEG image decompression library during the early 1990s. Little known today, it featured thumbnail based picture management, printing, etc.

The primary developer was Ray Bunnage from compression / decompression libraries developed by Howard Gordon and Chris Eddy.
