= Real Data Transport =

Transport protocol for audio-video data

Real Data Transport (RDT) is a proprietary transport protocol for the actual audio-video data, developed by RealNetworks in the 1990s. It is commonly used in companion with a control protocol for streaming media like the IETF's Real Time Streaming Protocol (RTSP).

A non-proprietary alternative for RDT is IETF's Real-time Transport Protocol (RTP), which is also implemented in RealNetworks players.

As reported in a 2002 book about firewalls, RDT used two unidirectional UDP connections, one for the data sent from the server to the client and another in the opposite direction for retransmission requests. The same book reported that RealNetworks' G2 server used RDT in this configuration by default. Another 2003 book reported that RDT was also seen carried over Transmission Control Protocol (TCP), as a fall-back mechanism.

RDT is now included as part of the Helix Community project.
