= Comet Cursor =

Software program

- Developer: Comet Systems
- Release: 1997
- Operating system: Microsoft Windows
- Type: Browser plugin, Spyware
- License: Proprietary

Comet Cursor was a software program written by Comet Systems. It allowed users of the Microsoft Windows operating system to change the appearance of their mouse cursor and to allow websites to use customized cursors for visitors. The product installed itself without user permission and is an early example of spyware.

== History ==
Comet Systems was founded in 1997. Its most famous product, Comet Cursor, was released the same year for free. When installed, Comet Cursor changes a user's mouse cursor when they visit participating websites. Websites could use these cursors to display their own brands instead of standard icons. By 1999, there were 55,000 websites using the technology, including Comedy Central, Mattel, and Warner Bros. Banner ads also used the technology. Comet reported 20 million users in 2001, when it integrated a price comparison service in the software.

The company was criticized for secretly tracking users who installed the software, each of whom was given a unique serial number. In November 1999, the company started distributing its software as part of a package with several versions of RealNetworks' RealPlayer multimedia software. That same month, the RealPlayer was accused of violating the privacy of its users and breaching its own privacy policy by collecting information about what software was installed alongside the RealPlayer. Compounding the issue of spyware, the software installed itself unknowingly on many users' computers. Microsoft's Internet Explorer browser allowed ActiveX controls, such as Comet Cursor, to install themselves with no user interaction and without asking permission, and users did not realize they had installed Comet Cursor with RealPlayer.

For these reasons, Comet Cursor was cited as one of the 25 Worst Tech Products by PC World. Although no longer distributed, the product has been blacklisted as spyware by some Internet watchdog companies such as Lavasoft and Symantec. Microsoft recommends that users who experience problems with the application uninstall it. FindWhat.com purchased Comet in February 2004, and the Comet Cursor was phased out of their product line.
