= Volume Logic =

- Developer(s): Plantronics (formerly Octiv)
- Stable release: 1.4 (Windows Only)
- Operating system: Windows / Mac
- Type: Audio Enhancement Plug-In
- Website: VolumeLogic.com

Volume Logic was commercial software which added audio enhancement features to media players. Originally released by Octiv Inc. in 2004, it was the first plug-in for Apple's iTunes for Mac and Windows. In April 2005, the Octiv corporation was acquired by Plantronics.

== Description ==
Volume Logic was available for RealPlayer, Windows Media Player, Winamp and Musicmatch. It was designed to subjectively improve the listening experience by increasing loudness of soft passages, controlling loudness of loud passages without audible distortion, emphasizes loudness of bass separately, for example. It corrected a problem with RealPlayer and the system's wave volume control. Volume Logic disabled RealPlayer's volume control and uses its own. Presets stored settings for the amount of each kind of processing to be applied: automatic gain control, limiting, bass boost, etc. Presets cannot be added. The Volume Logic plug-in incorporated multi-band dynamics processing technology, solving common audio problems such as speaker distortion and volume shifting.

In late 2005, Volume Logic 1.3 was released. This new version was recognized in Softpedia, MacUpdate, and Brothersoft. Having compatibility issues with Apple's Mac OS X v10.5, Plantronics ceased further development with Volume Logic, while leaving Windows users with a v1.4, which is compatible with iTunes 7.

Leif Claesson, the inventor of audio processing core technology utilized by Octiv and Volume Logic, in 2007 joined with Octiv co-founder Keith Edwards to form a partnership to sell follow-on technology called Breakaway.
