= Helix (multimedia project) =

Multimedia project

Helix DNA was a project to produce computer software that can play audio and video media in various formats and aid in creating such media. It was intended as a largely free and open-source digital media framework compatible with numerous operating systems and processors (including mobile phones) and it was started by RealNetworks, which contributed much of the code. The Helix Community was an open collaborative effort to develop and extend the Helix DNA platform. The Helix Project has been discontinued.

Helix DNA Client is a software package for multi-platform, multi-format media playback. Helix Player is a media player compatible with Linux, Solaris, Symbian, and FreeBSD and uses the Helix DNA Client. The Helix DNA Producer application aids in producing media files, and Helix DNA Server can stream media files over a network.

== Licenses ==
The code is released in binary and source code form under various licenses, notably the proprietary RealNetworks Community Source License and the free and open source software RealNetworks Public Source License. Additionally, the Helix DNA Client and the Helix Player are licensed under the popular GNU General Public License (GPL) free and open source license.

Use of the RDT, the default proprietary Real data transport, and of the RealVideo and RealAudio codecs requires binary components distributed under the Helix DNA Technology Binary Research Use License.

== Helix DNA Client ==
Helix DNA Client
- Original author: RealNetworks
- Type: Media playback engine
- License: GNU General Public License
- Website: www.realnetworks.com/helix/

Helix DNA Client powers many digital media applications, including RealPlayer for MS Windows, Mac OS and Linux (since version 10), RealPlayer Mobile, and Helix Player. It is used on Nokia, Motorola, Samsung and Sony Ericsson mobile phones. 800 million mobile phones with the Helix client have been shipped since 2004. It is also being used in embedded devices like the Internet Tablet OS from Nokia, which is found on the Nokia 770, N800 and N810 Internet Tablets. Cingular Video is also based on the framework. Other projects that use the Helix framework include RealNetwork's Rhapsody online music service, the Banshee and Amarok music players, and MediaReady 4000. Helix DNA also manifests itself as the RealPlayer on Mobile Internet Devices (MID) and on Netbooks.

Developers from the Open Source Lab announced in 2007 they would use Helix technologies for content creation applications and collaboration in the One Laptop Per Child project.

Helix DNA client contains support for the following media formats:

- Audio formats: Vorbis, AAC, AAC+, M4A, MP3, AMR-NB, AMR-WB, RealAudio, WMA, a-law, u-law and audio containers AIFF, WAV, AU
- Video formats: Theora, RealVideo, WMV, H.263, H.264, VC-1, H.261, MJPEG and container formats RealMedia file format, 3GP, 3G2, AVI, ASF
- Description formats: SMIL, SDP
- Image formats: JPEG, GIF, PNG
- Protocols: RTSP, RTP, HTTP, Multicast, RDT

== Helix DNA Client for Android ==
Helix DNA Client for Android
- Original author: RealNetworks
- Stable release: 1.1.2 / November 8, 2012; 13 years ago
- Written in: Java
- Operating system: Android 2.2, 2.3.x, 3.x, 4.x
- Type: Media playback engine
- License: Commercial proprietary software
- Website: www.realnetworks.com/helix/

Helix DNA Client for Android provides an HLS, MPEG-DASH, Verimatrix DRM and Microsoft PlayReady DRM media player for Android 2.2 to latest devices. Supporting H.264 and AAC codecs with Adaptive Bit Rate support (H.264 / AAC) including audio only. Armv7 and Armv6 supported using Stagefright media platform. Helix SDK is supplied as a library which is included within Android Java applications for over the air installation.

Helix DNA client contains support for the following media formats:

- Audio formats: AAC, RealAudio
- Video formats: H.264, RealVideo and container formats RealMedia file format, 3GP
- Protocols: HLS (Version 4), MPEG-DASH (ISO BMFF MP4)

== Helix DNA Server ==
Helix DNA Server
- Original author: RealNetworks
- Initial release: January 22, 2003; 23 years ago
- Type: Media streaming
- License: RealNetworks Public Source License, RealNetworks Community Source License
- Website: www.realnetworks.com/helix/

The Helix DNA Server, first released on 22 January 2003, supports streaming of following formats:

- RealVideo, RealAudio (.rm, .ra, .rv)
- MP3

It supports streaming to any device or application that supports HTTP, RTSP/RTP, TCP, UDP unicast and UDP multicast streaming protocols.

There is also a commercial version called Helix Server, which has more features and supports more media formats. It was originally called the Helix Universal Server when it was announced in or before 2002.

== Helix Player ==
Helix Player
- Original author: RealNetworks
- Stable release: 11.0
- Operating system: Linux, Solaris, Symbian, FreeBSD
- Type: Media player
- License: GNU General Public License
- Website: www.realnetworks.com/helix/

It is based on the Helix DNA Client. It is available for Linux, Solaris, Symbian and FreeBSD. Users of Microsoft Windows and Mac OS X can use RealPlayer, which has similar capabilities.

== Helix DNA Producer ==
Helix DNA Producer
- Original author: RealNetworks
- Stable release: 11
- Operating system: Windows, Linux, Mac OS X
- Type: Media encoder
- License: RealNetworks Community Source License; RealNetworks Public Source License
- Website: www.realnetworks.com/helix/

It is a media encoding engine for creating streaming broadcasts, on-demand streaming content, and downloadable audio video files. The Helix DNA Producer runs on MS Windows, Linux and Mac OS X.

The Helix DNA Producer contains output support for the following data types:

- RealAudio 10, 8, G2
- RealVideo 10, 9, 8, 7, G2
- Ogg Vorbis

Developers who want MP3 encoding can license the code from RealNetworks for a fee. There is also an add-on package for Helix DNA Producer SDK with AAC or aacPlus encoding support.

Helix DNA Producer was also available in a commercial, closed-source version –RealProducer Plus for MS Windows and Linux.

== See also ==
- Comparison of video player software
- RealNetworks
- RealPlayer
