= ClearVideo =

Video codec

ClearVideo was a video codec created by Iterated Systems Limited. It was one of the codecs available for the RealVideo container format. ClearVideo was marketed as a system that used fractal compression.

FFmpeg contains a decoder for a ClearVideo format, based on DCT encoding.
