= Tel-musici =

The Tel-musici was an early entertainment innovation, which used telephone lines to transmit phonograph recordings to individual households. Subscribers called a central "music room" to request selections, which they listened to at home over specially designed loudspeakers called "magnaphones". The service later incorporated live programs, expanding its operations to more along the lines of a general "telephone newspaper".

A Tel-musici company was incorporated in Delaware in 1908, and the service began operation in Wilmington the next year. However, although there were plans to expand throughout the United States, only this single location ever became operational, until it ceased operations around 1914.

== History ==
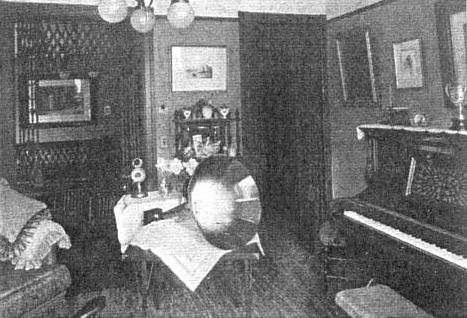
Tel-musici service home installation

The primary individual behind the Tel-musici was inventor George R. Webb. In January 1908, while soliciting for investors, he arranged a demonstration of the concept at a Baltimore hotel, where listeners telephoned a remote location with their requests, which were played back as "'10 cents' worth of Lohengrin,' or 'a quarter's worth of ragtime'" to the assembled participants. Shortly thereafter, a Tel-musici company with a capitalization of $10,000 was incorporated in the state of Delaware by "a number of Baltimorians".

In 1909 an operating Tel-musici system was established in Wilmington, Delaware, with George Webb as the company president, and J. J. Comer the general manager. The music rooms' musical library was described as comprehensive and "embracing a complete line of all the latest productions". The charge was three cents for each requested standard tune, and seven cents for grand opera. Subscribers were required to guarantee purchases totaling $18 per year. Provisions were also made for transmitting a general program in lieu of individual requests.

The promoters hoped to interest local telephone companies in installing their own Tel-musici operations. The Wilmington operation was later taken over by the Wilmington and Philadelphia Traction Co., which operated a Wilmington telephone franchise, and an advertisement for a Tel-musici "dance music program" appeared as late as 1914. However, it does not appear that any additional installations became operational.

Tel-musici's sending music room (Wilmington, Delaware, 1909)

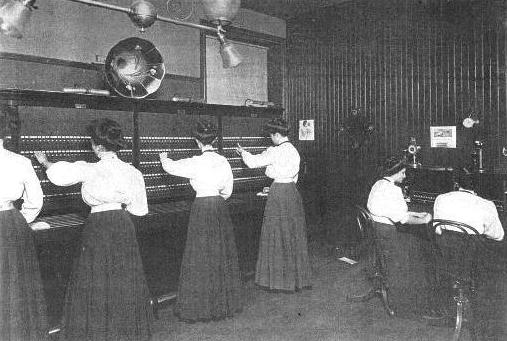
Left side (manual switchboards, for connecting telephone subscribers to the record players)

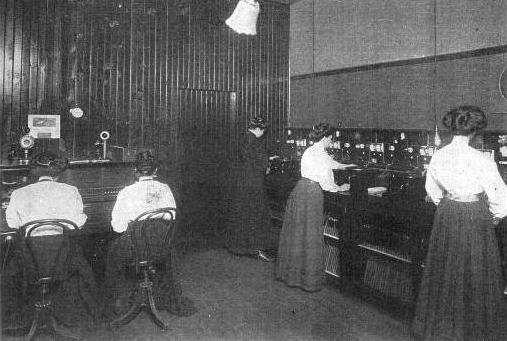
Right side (record players for playing requested songs)

In 1912, George Webb began promoting the similarly conceived Magnaphone system, established in New York City, which was intended to transmit recording and other audio offerings to subscribers for eight dollars a month. The New York Magnaphone and Music Company was granted a twenty-five year franchise for operations "in the Borough of Manhattan and that part of the Borough of The Bronx west of the Bronx River", however, the franchise was never built. J. J. Comer would later participate, in conjunction with the Automatic Electric Company of Chicago, with development of the Musolaphone system, which briefly operated in southside Chicago, and which transmitted live news and entertainment to subscribing homes and businesses over telephone lines.
