= Video over cellular =

Streaming video technology with cellular networks

Video over cellular (VoC), also known as VoCIP (video over cellular Internet Protocol), is a term used for processing streaming video such as surveillance, using high-resolution video cameras over 3G and 4G cellular networks. Creating a VoC transmission requires encoding and decoding of video packets of data. The method of transport over a cellular packet switched network such as EvDO, HSPA, LTE or WiMax have been restricted to a standard five-gigabyte monthly limit of data from the carrier.

In 2009, VoC solutions are now used in applications for public safety and for TV broadcasting, using traditional wireless carriers such as Verizon Wireless, Sprint Nextel and AT&T Mobility that support 3G and 4G wireless broadband speeds. Public-safety organizations are harnessing this technology to support police and sheriff special forces such as SWAT and SERT programs that require covert video surveillance, without the wires previously required in traditional surveillance solutions, providing high-definition streaming video.

== Television reporting ==
VoC is also rapidly gaining use in electronic news-gathering and remote broadcasting, where it is used in place of remote pickup units (RPUs), which must be temporarily fixed in a certain position, with an antenna often on a telescoping pole or satellite dish atop an outside broadcast van. RPUs are also limiting in terms of setup time and space, safety regarding overhead powerlines, and the requirement for a line of sight back to the TV station or a remote receiving antenna.

VoC now allows reporters to transmit live from moving vehicles, and is now frequently used for storm chasing and reporting live from the scene of other still-breaking news stories. This may be as simple as smartphone apps like FaceTime or other off-the-shelf solutions, or dedicated or proprietary solutions housed in a small backpack transceiver unit worn by the cameraman. However, cellular service may be degraded or completely unavailable in the event of a mass call event or widespread power outage, both frequently caused by a disaster.

== Technology referenced ==
- Major domestic USA carriers such as Verizon, Sprint, T-Mobile and AT&T
- 3G/4G IP products such as Sierra Wireless, Digi and Bluetree Wireless
- IP networking surveillance cameras such as Sony and Axis

== Current deployments of VoC solutions ==
- Riverside Sheriffs Department - Sheriff Emergency Response Team (SERT)
- Los Angeles Police Department - Special Weapons and Tactics (SWAT)
- , Infodraw inc., Servision, Elsight, Vsense - all sell VOC devices most are based in Israel.
