= Streaming media =

Multimedia delivery method

On websites such as YouTube, videos such as this short NASA film about spacesuit design are played instantly depending on the user's internet connection, and the video is partially downloaded in the background.

Streaming media is the method by which multimedia data is delivered through a network for playback using a digital media player or media player software. Media is transferred in a stream of packets from a server to a client and is rendered in real-time or near real-time; this contrasts with file downloading, a process in which the end-user obtains an entire media file before consuming the content. Streaming is more commonly used for video on demand, streaming television, and music streaming services over the Internet.

While streaming is most commonly associated with multimedia from a remote server over the Internet, it also includes offline multimedia between devices on a local area network. For example, using DLNA and a home server, or in a personal area network between two devices using Bluetooth (which uses radio waves rather than IP). Online streaming was initially popularized by RealNetworks and Microsoft in the 1990s and has since grown to become the globally most popular method for consuming music and videos, with numerous competing subscription services being offered since the 2010s. Audio streaming to wireless speakers, often using Bluetooth, is another use that has become prevalent during that decade. Live streaming is the real-time delivery of content during production, much as live television broadcasts content via linear and cable channels.

Distinguishing delivery methods from the media applies specifically to, as most of the traditional media delivery systems are either inherently streaming (e.g., radio, television) or inherently non-streaming (e.g., books, videotapes, audio CDs). The term "streaming media" can apply to media other than video and audio, such as live closed captioning and real-time text, which are all considered "streaming text".

== Etymology ==
The term "streaming" was first used for tape drives manufactured by Data Electronics Inc. that were meant to slowly ramp up and run for the entire track; slower ramp times lowered drive costs. "Streaming" was applied in the early 1990s as a better description for video on demand and later live video on IP networks. It was first done by Starlight Networks for video streaming and Real Networks for audio streaming. Such video had previously been referred to by the misnomer "store and forward video."

== Precursors ==
Beginning in 1881, Théâtrophone enabled subscribers to listen to opera and theatre performances over telephone lines. This operated until 1932. The Telharmonium was patented in 1897. The concept of media streaming eventually came to America. The Tel-musici service operated in Delaware from 1909 to 1914.

In the early 1920s, George Owen Squier was granted patents for a system for the transmission and distribution of signals over electrical lines, which was the technical basis for what later became Muzak, a technology for streaming continuous music to commercial customers without the use of radio.

The Telephone Music Service, a live jukebox service, began in 1929 and continued until 1997. The clientele eventually included 120 bars and restaurants in the Pittsburgh area. A tavern customer would deposit money in the jukebox, use a telephone on top of the jukebox, and ask the operator to play a song. The operator would find the record in the studio library of more than 100,000 records, put it on a turntable, and the music would be piped over the telephone line to play in the tavern. The music media began as 78s, 33s and 45s, played on the six turntables they monitored. CDs and tapes were incorporated in later years.

The business had a succession of owners, notably Bill Purse, his daughter Helen Reutzel, and finally Dotti White. The revenue stream for each quarter was split between 60% for the music service and 40% for the tavern owner. This business model eventually became unsustainable due to city permits and the cost of setting up these telephone lines.

== History ==
=== Early development ===
Attempts to display media on computers date back to the earliest days of computing in the mid-20th century. However, little progress was made for several decades, primarily due to the high cost and limited capabilities of computer hardware. From the late 1980s through the 1990s, consumer-grade personal computers became powerful enough to display various media. The primary technical issues related to streaming were having enough CPU and bus bandwidth to support the required data rates and achieving the real-time computing performance required to prevent buffer underruns and enable smooth streaming of the content. However, computer networks were still limited in the mid-1990s, and audio and video media were usually delivered over non-streaming channels, such as playback from a local hard disk drive or CD-ROMs on the end user's computer.

Terminology in the 1970s was at best confusing for applications such as telemetered aircraft or missile test data. By then PCM [Pulse Code Modulation] was the dominant transmission type. This PCM transmission was bit-serial and not packetized so the 'streaming' terminology was often a confusion factor. In 1969 Grumman acquired one of the first telemetry ground stations [Automated Telemetry Station, 'ATS'] which had the capability for reconstructing serial telemetered data which had been recorded on digital computer peripheral tapes. Computer peripheral tapes were inherently recorded in blocks. Reconstruction was required for continuous display purposes without time-base distortion. The Navy implemented similar capability in DoD for the first time in 1973. These implementations are the only known examples of true 'streaming' in the sense of reconstructing distortion-free serial data from packetized or blocked recordings. 'Real-time' terminology has also been confusing in the streaming context. The most accepted definition of 'real-time' requires that all associated processing or formatting of the data must take place prior to availability of the next sample of each measurement. In the 1970s, the most powerful mainframe computers were not fast enough for this task at significant overall data rates in the range of 50,000 samples per second. For that reason, both the Grumman ATS and the Navy Real-time Telemetry Processing System [RTPS] employed unique special-purpose digital computers dedicated to real-time processing of raw data samples.

In 1990, the first commercial Ethernet switch was introduced by Kalpana, which enabled the more powerful computer networks that led to the first streaming video solutions used by schools and corporations.

Practical streaming media was only made possible with advances in data compression due to the impractically high bandwidth requirements of uncompressed media. Raw digital audio encoded with pulse-code modulation (PCM) requires a bandwidth of 1.4 Mbit/s for uncompressed CD audio, while raw digital video requires a bandwidth of 168 Mbit/s for SD video and over 1000 Mbit/s for FHD video.

=== Late 1990s to early 2000s ===
During the late 1990s and early 2000s, users had increased access to computer networks, especially the Internet. During the early 2000s, users had access to increased network bandwidth, especially in the last mile. These technological improvements facilitated the streaming of audio and video content to computer users in their homes and workplaces. There was also an increasing use of standard protocols and formats, such as TCP/IP, HTTP, and HTML, as the Internet became increasingly commercialized, which led to an infusion of investment into the sector.

The band Severe Tire Damage was the first group to perform live on the Internet. On 24 June 1993, the band was playing a gig at Xerox PARC, while elsewhere in the building, scientists were discussing new technology (the Mbone) for broadcasting on the Internet using multicasting. As proof of PARC's technology, the band's performance was broadcast and could be seen live in Australia and elsewhere. In a March 2017 interview, band member Russ Haines stated that the band had used approximately "half of the total bandwidth of the internet" to stream the performance, which was a 152 × 76 pixel video, updated eight to twelve times per second, with audio quality that was, "at best, a bad telephone connection." In October 1994, a school music festival was webcast from the Michael Fowler Centre in Wellington, New Zealand. The technician who arranged the webcast, local council employee Richard Naylor, later commented: "We had 16 viewers in 12 countries."

RealNetworks pioneered the broadcast of a baseball game between the New York Yankees and the Seattle Mariners over the Internet in 1995. The first symphonic concert on the Internet—a collaboration between the Seattle Symphony and guest musicians Slash, Matt Cameron, and Barrett Martin—took place at the Paramount Theater in Seattle, Washington, on 10 November 1995.

In 1996, Marc Scarpa produced the first large-scale, online, live broadcast, the Adam Yauch–led Tibetan Freedom Concert, an event that would define the format of social change broadcasts. Scarpa continued to pioneer in the streaming media world with projects such as Woodstock '99, Townhall with President Clinton, and more later Covered CA's campaign "Tell a Friend Get Covered", which was livestreamed on YouTube.

=== Business developments ===
Xing Technology was founded in 1989 and developed a JPEG streaming product called "StreamWorks". Another streaming product appeared in late 1992 and was named StarWorks. StarWorks enabled on-demand MPEG-1 full-motion videos to be randomly accessed on corporate Ethernet networks. Starworks was from Starlight Networks, which also pioneered live video streaming on Ethernet and via Internet Protocol over satellites with Hughes Network Systems. Other early companies that created streaming media technology include Progressive Networks and Protocomm prior to widespread World Wide Web usage. After the Netscape IPO in 1995 (and the release of Windows 95 with built-in TCP/IP support), usage of the Internet expanded, and many companies "went public", including Progressive Networks (which was renamed "RealNetworks", and listed on Nasdaq as "RNWK"). As the web became even more popular in the late 90s, streaming video on the internet blossomed from startups such as Vivo Software (later acquired by RealNetworks), VDOnet (acquired by RealNetworks), Precept (acquired by Cisco), and Xing (acquired by RealNetworks).

Microsoft developed a media player known as ActiveMovie in 1995 that supported streaming media and included a proprietary streaming format, which was the precursor to the streaming feature later in Windows Media Player 6.4 in 1999. In June 1999, Apple also introduced a streaming media format in its QuickTime 4 application. It was later also widely adopted on websites, along with RealPlayer and Windows Media streaming formats. The competing formats on websites required each user to download the respective applications for streaming, which resulted in many users having to have all three applications on their computer for general compatibility.

In 2000, Industryview.com launched its "world's largest streaming video archive" website to help businesses promote themselves. Webcasting became an emerging tool for business marketing and advertising that combined the immersive nature of television with the interactivity of the Web. The ability to collect data and feedback from potential customers caused this technology to gain momentum quickly.

Around 2002, the interest in a single, unified, streaming format and the widespread adoption of Adobe Flash prompted the development of a video streaming format through Flash, which was the format used in Flash-based players on video hosting sites. The first popular video streaming site, YouTube, was founded by Steve Chen, Chad Hurley, and Jawed Karim in 2005. It initially used a Flash-based player, which played MPEG-4 AVC video and AAC audio, but now defaults to HTML video. Increasing consumer demand for live streaming prompted YouTube to implement a new live streaming service for users. The company currently also offers a (secure) link that returns the available connection speed of the user.

The Recording Industry Association of America (RIAA) revealed through its 2015 earnings report that streaming services were responsible for 34.3 percent of the year's total music industry's revenue, growing 29 percent from the previous year and becoming the largest source of income, pulling in around $2.4 billion. US streaming revenue grew 57 percent to $1.6 billion in the first half of 2016 and accounted for almost half of industry sales.

=== Streaming wars ===
The term streaming wars was coined to describe the new era (starting in the late 2010s) of competition between video streaming services such as Netflix, Amazon Prime Video, Hulu, HBO Max, Disney+, Paramount+, Apple TV, Peacock, and many more.

The competition between increasingly popular online platforms, such as Netflix and Amazon, and legacy broadcasters and studios moving online, like Disney and NBC, has driven each service to find ways to differentiate from one another. A key differentiator has been offering exclusive content, often self-produced and created for a specific market segment.

When Netflix first launched in 2007, it became one of the more dominant streaming platforms even though it initially offered no original content. It would be nearly six years before Netflix began offering its own shows, such as House of Cards, Orange Is the New Black, and Hemlock Grove. The legacy services also began producing original digital-only content, but they also began restricting their back catalog of shows and movies to their platforms, one of the most notable examples being Disney+. Disney took advantage of owning popular movies and shows like Frozen, Snow White, and the Star Wars and Marvel franchises, which could draw in more subscribers and make it a more serious competitor to Netflix and Amazon. Research suggests that this approach to streaming competition can be disadvantageous for consumers by increasing spending across platforms, and for the industry as a whole by dilution of subscriber base. Once specific content is made available on a streaming service, piracy searches for the same content decrease; competition or legal availability across multiple platforms appears to deter online piracy. Exclusive content produced for subscription services such as Netflix tends to have a higher production budget than content produced exclusively for pay-per-view services, such as Amazon Prime Video.

This competition increased during the first two years of the COVID-19 pandemic as more people stayed home and watched TV. "The COVID-19 pandemic has led to a seismic shift in the film & TV industry in terms of how films are made, distributed, and screened. Many industries have been hit by the economic effects of the pandemic" (Totaro Donato). In August 2022, a CNN headline declared that "The streaming wars are over" as pandemic-era restrictions had largely ended and audience growth had stalled. This led services to focus on profit over market share by cutting production budgets, cracking down on password sharing, and introducing ad-supported tiers. A December 2022 article in The Verge echoed this, declaring an end to the "golden age of the streaming wars".

In September 2023, several streaming services formed a trade association named the Streaming Innovation Alliance (SIA), spearheaded by Charles Rivkin of the Motion Picture Association (MPA). Former U.S. representative Fred Upton and former Federal Communications Commission (FCC) acting chair Mignon Clyburn serve as senior advisors. Founding members include AfroLandTV, America Nu Network, BET+, The Africa Channel, Discovery+, FedNet, For Us By Us Network, In the Black Network, Max, Motion Picture Association, MotorTrend+, Netflix, Paramount+, Peacock, Pluto TV, Radiant, SkinsPlex, Telemundo, TelevisaUnivision, TVEI, Vault TV, Vix, and The Walt Disney Company. Notably absent were Apple, Amazon, Roku, and Tubi.

== Use by the general public ==
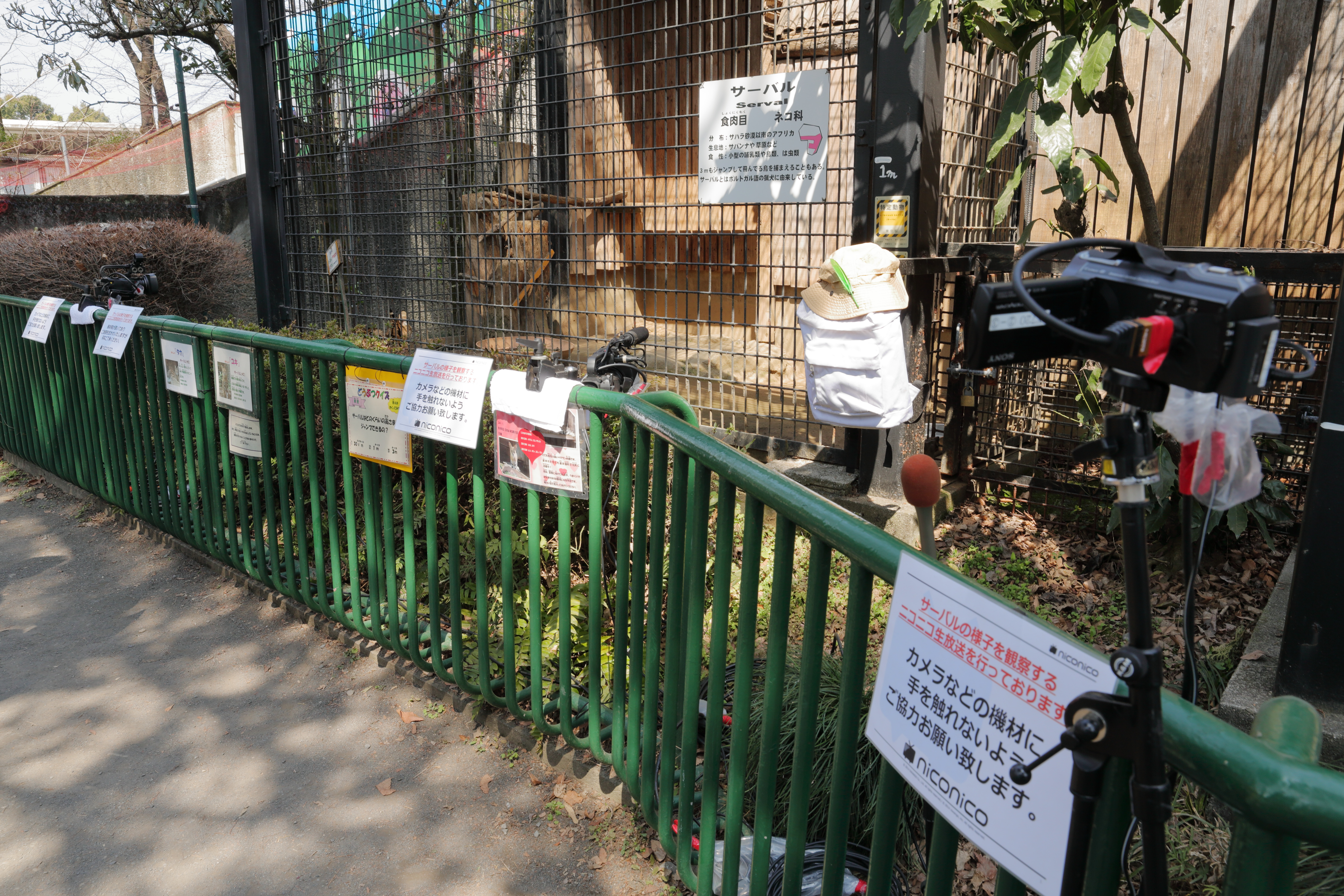
A camera live streaming at a zoo by Niconico

Advances in computer networking, combined with powerful home computers and operating systems, have made streaming media affordable and easy for the public. Stand-alone Internet radio devices emerged to offer listeners a non-technical option for listening to audio streams. These audio-streaming services became increasingly popular; music streaming reached 4 trillion streams globally in 2023—a significant increase from 2022—jumping 34% over the year.

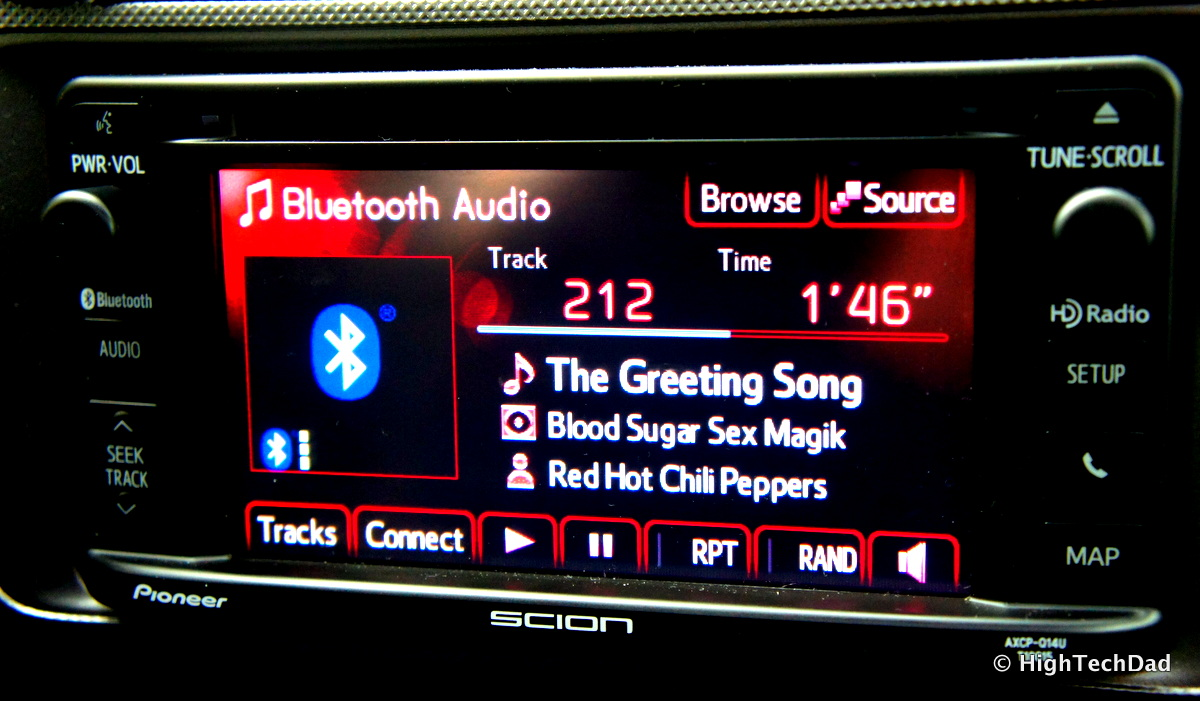
A car audio receiver playing music being streamed via Bluetooth from a smartphone

In general, multimedia content is data-intensive, so media storage and transmission costs are still significant. Media is generally compressed for transport and storage. Increasing consumer demand for streaming high-definition (HD) content has led the industry to develop technologies such as WirelessHD and G.hn, which are optimized for streaming HD content. Many developers have introduced HD streaming apps that work on smaller devices, such as tablets and smartphones, for everyday purposes.

"Streaming creates the illusion—greatly magnified by headphone use, which is another matter—that music is a utility you can turn on and off; the water metaphor is intrinsic to how it works. It dematerializes music, denies it a crucial measure of autonomy, reality, and power. It makes music seem disposable, impermanent. Hence it intensifies the ebb and flow of pop fashion, the way musical 'memes' rise up for a week or a month and are then forgotten. And it renders our experience of individual artists/groups shallower."

— Robert Christgau, 2018

A media stream can be streamed either live or on demand. Live streams are generally provided by a method called true streaming. True streaming sends the information straight to the computer or device without saving it to a local file. On-demand streaming is provided by a method called progressive download. Progressive download saves the received information to a local file and then plays it from that location. On-demand streams are often saved to files for extended period of time, while live streams are available at one time only (e.g., during a football game).

Streaming media is increasingly being coupled with the use of social media. For example, sites such as YouTube encourage social interaction in webcasts through features such as live chat, online surveys, user posting of comments online, and more. Furthermore, streaming media is increasingly being used for social business and e-learning.

The Horowitz Research State of Pay TV, OTT, and SVOD 2017 report said that 70 percent of those viewing content did so through a streaming service and that 40 percent of TV viewing was done this way, twice the number from five years earlier. Millennials, the report said, streamed 60 percent of the content.

=== Transition from DVD ===
One of the movie streaming industry's largest impacts was on the DVD industry, which drastically dropped in popularity and profitability with the mass popularization of online content. The rise of media streaming caused the downfall of many DVD rental companies, such as Blockbuster. In July 2015, The New York Times published an article about Netflix's DVD services. It stated that Netflix was continuing their DVD services with 5.3 million subscribers, which was a significant drop from the previous year. On the other hand, their streaming service had 65 million members. The shift to streaming platforms also led to the decline of DVD rental services. In July 2024, NBC News reported that RedBox, a DVD rental service that had operated for 22 years, would shut down due to the rapid incline of streaming platforms. As the rental services has been rapidly declining since 2010, the business had to file for bankruptcy, with 99% of households now subscribing to streaming services. Further reflecting the shift away from physical media, Best Buy has ceased selling DVDs.

=== Napster ===
Music streaming is one of the most popular ways in which consumers interact with streaming media. In the age of digitization, the private consumption of music has transformed into a public good, largely due to Napster.

Napster, a peer-to-peer (P2P) file-sharing network where users could upload and download MP3 files freely, broke all music industry conventions when it launched in early 1999 in Hull, Massachusetts. The platform was developed by Shawn and John Fanning as well as Sean Parker. In an interview from 2009, Shawn Fanning explained that Napster "was something that came to me as a result of seeing a sort of unmet need and the passion people had for being able to find all this music, particularly a lot of the obscure stuff, which wouldn't be something you go to a record store and purchase, so it felt like a problem worth solving."

Not only did this development disrupt the music industry by making songs that previously required payment to be freely accessible to any Napster user, but it also demonstrated the power of P2P networks in turning any digital file into a public, shareable good. For the brief period of time that Napster existed, mp3 files fundamentally changed as a type of good. Songs were no longer financially excludable, barring access to a computer with internet access, and they were not rivals, meaning if one person downloaded a song, it did not diminish another user from doing the same. Napster, like most other providers of public goods, faced the free-rider problem. Every user benefits when an individual uploads an mp3 file, but there is no requirement or mechanism that forces all users to share their music. Generally, the platform encouraged sharing; users who downloaded files from others often had their own files available for upload as well. However, not everyone chose to share their files. There was no built-in incentive specifically discouraging users from sharing their own files.

This structure revolutionized the consumer's perception of ownership over digital goods; it made music freely replicable. Napster quickly garnered millions of users, growing faster than any other business in history. At the peak of its existence, Napster boasted about 80 million users globally. The site gained so much traffic that many college campuses had to block access to Napster because it created network congestion from so many students sharing music files.

The advent of Napster sparked the creation of numerous other P2P sites, including LimeWire (2000), BitTorrent (2001), and the Pirate Bay (2003). The reign of P2P networks was short-lived. The first to fall was Napster in 2001. Numerous lawsuits were filed against Napster by various record labels, all of which were subsidiaries of Universal Music Group, Sony Music Entertainment, Warner Music Group, or EMI. In addition to this, the Recording Industry Association of America (RIAA) also filed a lawsuit against Napster on the grounds of unauthorized distribution of copyrighted material, which ultimately led Napster to shut down in 2001. In an interview with the New York Times, Gary Stiffelman, who represents Eminem, Aerosmith, and TLC, explained, "I'm not an opponent of artists' music being included in these services, I'm just an opponent of their revenue not being shared."

==== The fight for intellectual property rights: A&M Records, Inc. v. Napster, Inc. ====
The lawsuit A&M Records, Inc. v. Napster, Inc. fundamentally changed the way consumers interact with music streaming. It was argued on 2 October 2000, and was decided on 12 February 2001. The Court of Appeals for the Ninth Circuit ruled that a P2P file-sharing service could be held liable for contributory and vicarious infringement of copyright, serving as a landmark decision for Intellectual property law.

The first issue that the Court addressed was fair use, which says that otherwise infringing activities are permissible so long as they are for purposes "such as criticism, comment, news reporting, teaching [...] scholarship, or research." Judge Beezer, the judge for this case, noted that Napster claimed that its services fit "three specific alleged fair uses: sampling, where users make temporary copies of a work before purchasing; space-shifting, where users access a sound recording through the Napster system that they already own in audio CD format; and permissive distribution of recordings by both new and established artists." Judge Beezer found that Napster did not fit these criteria, instead enabling their users to repeatedly copy music, which would affect the market value of the copyrighted good.

The second claim by the plaintiffs was that Napster was actively contributing to copyright infringement since it had knowledge of widespread file sharing on its platform. Since Napster took no action to reduce infringement and financially benefited from repeated use, the court ruled against the P2P site. The court found that "as much as eighty-seven percent of the files available on Napster may be copyrighted and more than seventy percent may be owned or administered by plaintiffs."

The injunction ordered against Napster ended the brief period in which music streaming was a public good – non-rival and non-excludable in nature. Other P2P networks had some success at sharing MP3s, though they all met a similar fate in court. The ruling set the precedent that copyrighted digital content cannot be freely replicated and shared unless given consent by the owner, thereby strengthening the property rights of artists and record labels alike.

=== Music streaming platforms ===
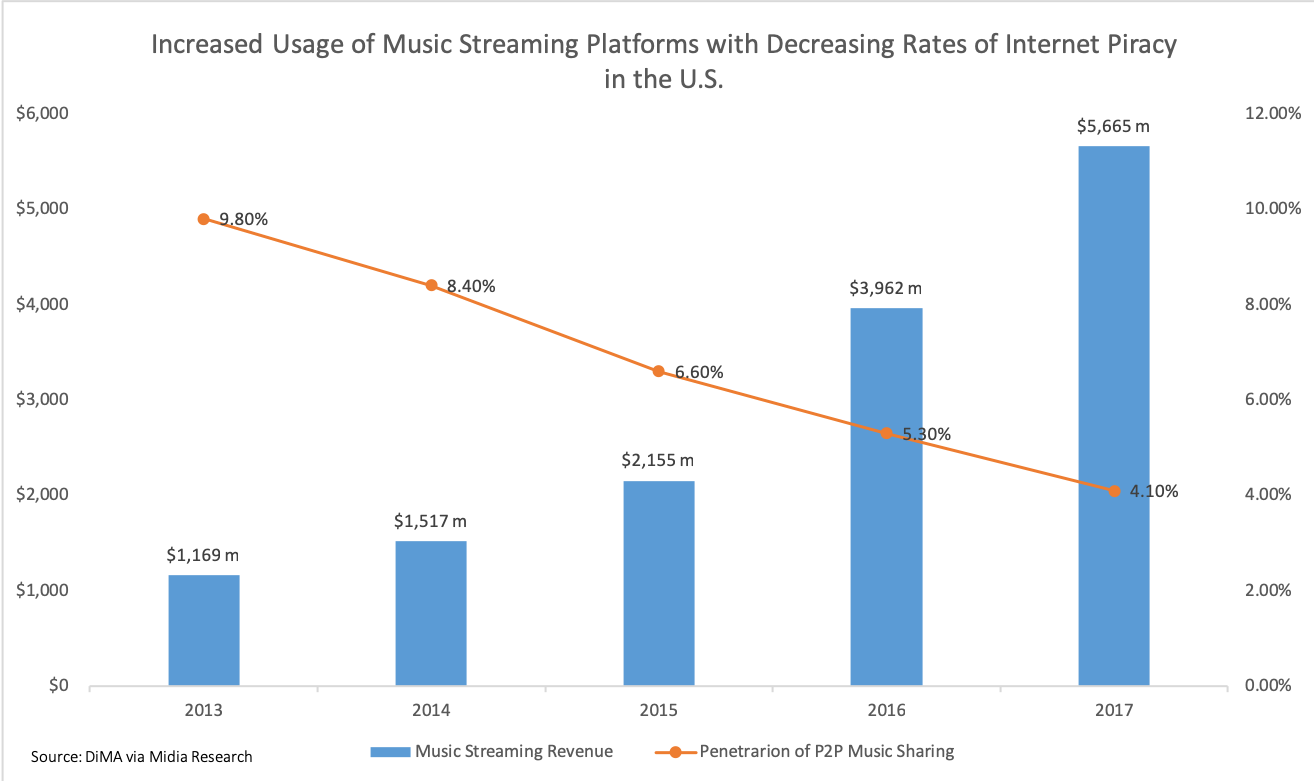
As music streaming platforms have become more prevalent in the US, music piracy rates have fallen. Piracy rates are calculated as a function of US total population.

Although music streaming is no longer a freely replicable public good, streaming platforms such as Spotify, Deezer, Apple Music, SoundCloud, YouTube Music, and Amazon Music have shifted music streaming to a club-type good. While some platforms, most notably Spotify, give customers access to a freemium service that enables the use of limited features for exposure to advertisements, most companies operate under a premium subscription model. Under such circumstances, music streaming is financially excludable, requiring that customers pay a monthly fee for access to a music library, but non-rival, since one customer's use does not impair another's.

An article written by The New York Times in 2021 states that "streaming saved music." This is because it provided monthly revenue. Especially Spotify offers its free platform, but you can pay for their premium to get music ad-free. This allows access for people to stream music anywhere from their devices not having to rely on CDs anymore.

There is competition between services similar but lesser to the streaming wars for video media. As of 2019, Spotify has over 207 million users in 78 countries, As of 2018, Apple Music has about 60 million, and SoundCloud has 175 million. All platforms provide varying degrees of accessibility. Apple Music and Prime Music only offer their services for paid subscribers, whereas Spotify and SoundCloud offer freemium and premium services. Napster, owned by Rhapsody since 2011, has resurfaced as a music streaming platform offering subscription-based services to over 4.5 million users as of January 2017.

In the evolving music streaming landscape, competition among platforms is shaped by various factors, including royalty rates, exclusive content, and market expansion strategies. A notable development occurred in January 2025, when Universal Music Group (UMG) and Spotify announced a new multi-year agreement. This partnership aims to enhance opportunities for artists and consumers through innovative subscription tiers and an enriched audio-visual catalog.

The music industry's response to music streaming was initially negative. Along with music piracy, streaming services disrupted the market and contributed to the fall in US revenue from $14.6 billion in 1999 to $6.3 billion in 2009. CDs and single-track downloads were not selling because content was freely available on the Internet. By 2018, however, music streaming revenue exceeded that of traditional revenue streams (e.g., record sales, album sales, downloads). Streaming revenue is now one of the largest driving forces behind the growth in the music industry.

=== COVID-19 pandemic ===
Theater ticket sales declined with the rise of streaming services, and theaters did not fully recover from declines during the COVID-19 pandemic when many were closed.

By August 2020, the COVID-19 pandemic had streaming services busier than ever. The pandemic contributed to a surge in subscriptions; in the UK alone, 12 million people joined a new streaming service that they had not previously had. Global subscriptions skyrocketed passing 1 billion. Within the first 3 months, back in 2020, nearly 15.7 million people signed up for Netflix.

An impact analysis of 2020 data by the International Confederation of Societies of Authors and Composers (CISAC) indicated that remuneration from digital streaming of music increased with a strong rise in digital royalty collection (up 16.6% to EUR 2.4 billion), but it would not compensate the overall loss of income of authors from concerts, public performance and broadcast. The International Federation of the Phonographic Industry (IFPI) recompiled the music industry initiatives around the world related to the COVID-19. In its State of the Industry report, it recorded that the global recorded music market grew by 7.4% in 2022, the 6th consecutive year of growth. This growth was driven by streaming, mostly from paid subscription streaming revenues which increased by 18.5%, fueled by 443 million users of subscription accounts by the end of 2020.

The COVID-19 pandemic has also driven an increase in misinformation and disinformation, particularly on streaming platforms like YouTube and podcasts.

=== Local/home streaming ===
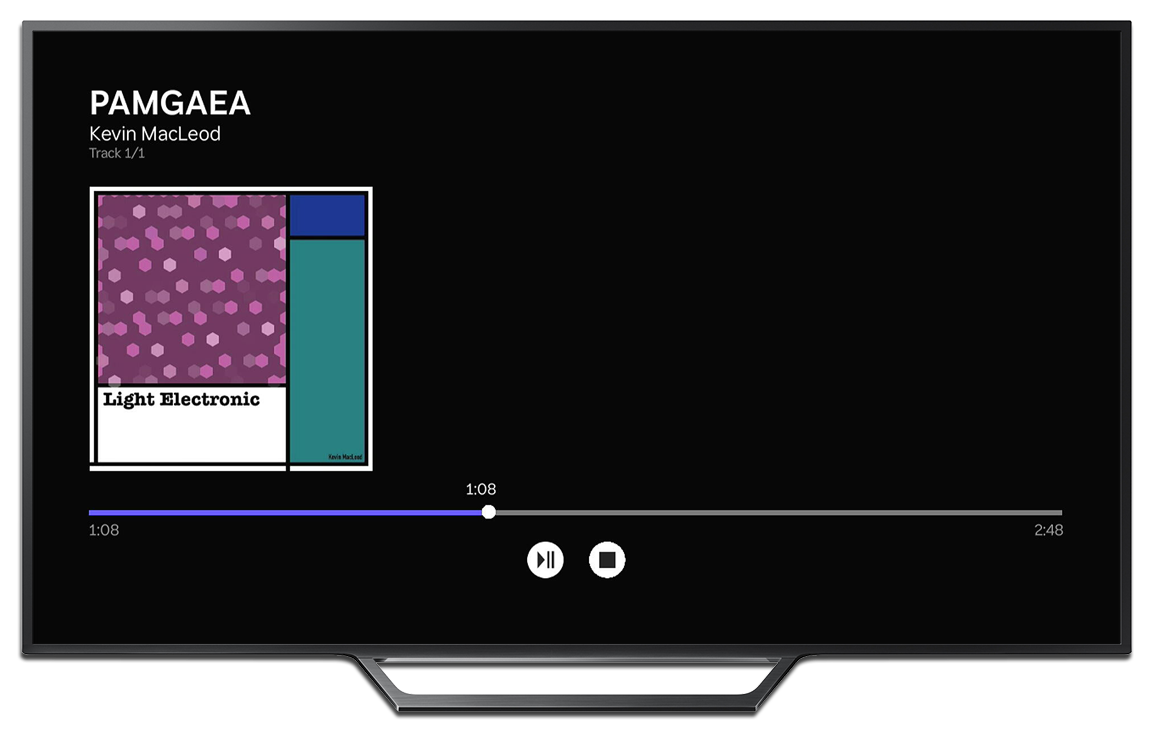
A TV set streaming an audio file from a local home server

Streaming also refers to the offline streaming of multimedia at home. This is made possible by technologies such as DLNA, which allow devices on the same local network to connect to each other and share media. Such capabilities are heightened using network-attached storage (NAS) devices at home, or using specialized software like Plex Media Server, Jellyfin or TwonkyMedia.

== Technologies ==
=== Bandwidth ===
A broadband speed of 2 Mbit/s or more is recommended for streaming standard-definition video, for example to a Roku, Apple TV, Google TV or a Sony TV Blu-ray Disc Player. 5 Mbit/s is recommended for high-definition content and 25 Mbit/s for ultra-high-definition content. Streaming media storage size is calculated from the streaming bandwidth and length of the media using the following formula (for a single user and file): storage size in megabytes is equal to length (in seconds) × bit rate (in bit/s) / (8 × 1024 × 1024). For example, one hour of digital video encoded at 300 kbit/s (this was a typical broadband video in 2005 and it was usually encoded in 320 × 240 resolution) will be: (3,600 s × 300,000 bit/s) / (8 × 1024 × 1024) requires around 128 MB of storage.

If the file is stored on a server for on-demand streaming and this stream is viewed by 1,000 people at the same time using a Unicast protocol, the requirement is 300 kbit/s × 1,000 =300,000 kbit/s =300 Mbit/s of bandwidth. This is equivalent to around 135 GB per hour. Using a multicast protocol, the server sends out only a single stream that is common to all users. Therefore, such a stream would only use 300 kbit/s of server bandwidth.

In 2018 video was more than 60% of data traffic worldwide and accounted for 80% of growth in data usage.

=== Protocols ===
Unicast connections require multiple connections from the same streaming server even when it streams the same content.

Video and audio streams are compressed to make the file size smaller. Audio coding formats include MP3, Vorbis, AAC and Opus. Video coding formats include H.264, HEVC, VP8, VP9 and AV1. Encoded audio and video streams are assembled in a container bitstream such as MP4, FLV, WebM, ASF or ISMA. The bitstream is delivered from a streaming server to a streaming client (e.g., the computer user with their Internet-connected laptop) using a transport protocol, such as Adobe's RTMP or RTP.

In the 2010s, technologies such as Apple's HLS, Microsoft's Smooth Streaming, Adobe's HDS and non-proprietary formats such as MPEG-DASH emerged to enable adaptive bitrate streaming over HTTP as an alternative to using proprietary transport protocols. Often, a streaming transport protocol is used to send video from an event venue to a cloud transcoding service and content delivery network, which then uses HTTP-based transport protocols to distribute the video to individual homes and users. The streaming client (the end user) may interact with the streaming server using a control protocol, such as MMS or RTSP.

The quality of the interaction between servers and users is based on the workload of the streaming service; as more users attempt to access a service, the quality may be affected by resource constraints in the service. Deploying clusters of streaming servers is one such method where there are regional servers spread across the network, managed by a singular, central server containing copies of all the media files as well as the IP addresses of the regional servers. This central server then uses load balancing and scheduling algorithms to redirect users to nearby regional servers capable of accommodating them. This approach also allows the central server to provide streaming data to both users as well as regional servers using FFmpeg libraries if required, thus demanding the central server to have powerful data processing and immense storage capabilities. In return, workloads on the streaming backbone network are balanced and alleviated, allowing for optimal streaming quality.

Designing a network protocol to support streaming media raises many problems. Datagram protocols, such as the User Datagram Protocol (UDP), send the media stream as a series of small packets. This is simple and efficient; however, there is no mechanism within the protocol to guarantee delivery. It is up to the receiving application to detect loss or corruption and recover data using error correction techniques. If data is lost, the stream may suffer a dropout. The Real-Time Streaming Protocol (RTSP), Real-time Transport Protocol (RTP) and the Real-time Transport Control Protocol (RTCP) were specifically designed to stream media over networks. RTSP runs over a variety of transport protocols, while the latter two are built on top of UDP.

HTTP adaptive bitrate streaming is based on HTTP progressive download, but contrary to the previous approach, here the files are very small, so that they can be compared to the streaming of packets, much like the case of using RTSP and RTP. Reliable protocols, such as the Transmission Control Protocol (TCP), guarantee correct delivery of each bit in the media stream. It means, however, that when there is data loss on the network, the media stream stalls while the protocol handlers detect the loss and retransmit the missing data. Clients can minimize this effect by buffering data for display. While delay due to buffering is acceptable in video-on-demand scenarios, users of interactive applications such as video conferencing will experience a loss of fidelity if the delay caused by buffering exceeds 200 ms.

Multicasting broadcasts the same copy of the multimedia over the entire network to a group of clients.

Unicast protocols send a separate copy of the media stream from the server to each recipient. Unicast is the norm for most Internet connections but does not scale well when many users want to view the same television program concurrently. Multicast protocols were developed to reduce server and network loads resulting from duplicate data streams that occur when many recipients receive unicast content streams independently. These protocols send a single stream from the source to a group of recipients. Depending on the network infrastructure and type, multicast transmission may or may not be feasible. One potential disadvantage of multicasting is the loss of video on demand functionality. Continuous streaming of radio or television material usually precludes the recipient's ability to control playback. However, this problem can be mitigated by elements such as caching servers, digital set-top boxes, and buffered media players.

IP multicast provides a means to send a single media stream to a group of recipients on a computer network. A connection management protocol, usually Internet Group Management Protocol, is used to manage the delivery of multicast streams to the groups of recipients on a LAN. One of the challenges in deploying IP multicast is that routers and firewalls between LANs must allow the passage of packets destined to multicast groups. If the organization that is serving the content has control over the network between server and recipients (i.e., educational, government, and corporate intranets), then routing protocols such as Protocol Independent Multicast can be used to deliver stream content to multiple local area network segments.

Peer-to-peer (P2P) protocols arrange for prerecorded streams to be sent between computers. This prevents the server and its network connections from becoming a bottleneck. However, it raises technical, performance, security, quality, and business issues.

Content delivery networks (CDNs) use intermediate servers to distribute the load. Internet-compatible unicast delivery is used between CDN nodes and streaming destinations.

=== Recording ===
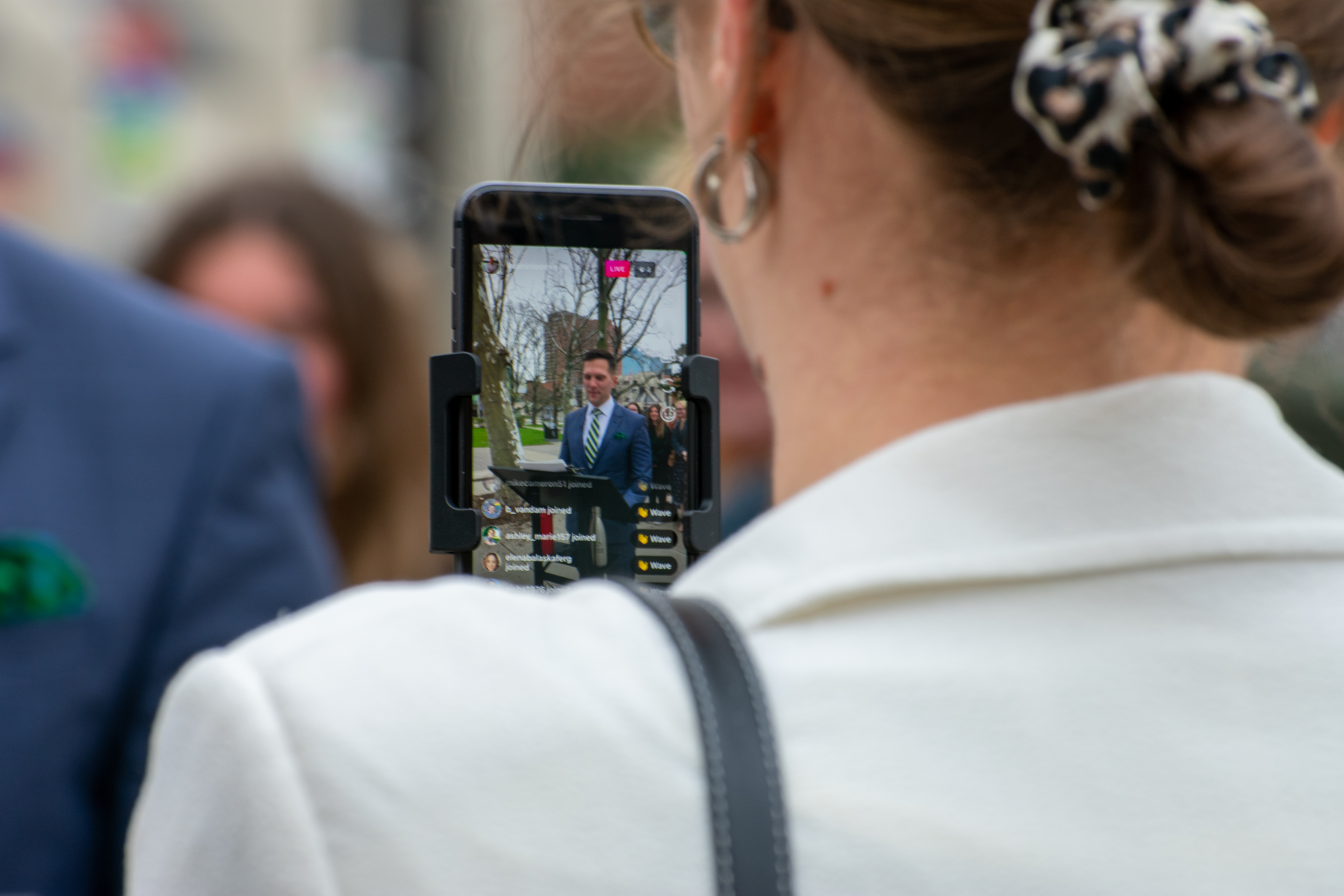
A candidate being livestreamed with a smartphone, in the 2022 Hamilton, Ontario, municipal election

Media that is livestreamed can be recorded through certain media players, such as VLC player, or through the use of a screen recorder. Live-streaming platforms such as Twitch may also incorporate a video on demand system that allows automatic recording of live broadcasts so that they can be watched later. YouTube also has recordings of live broadcasts, including television shows aired on major networks. These streams have the potential to be recorded by anyone who has access to them, whether legally or otherwise.

Recordings can happen through any device that allows people to watch movies they do not have access to or be at a music festival they could not get tickets to. These live streaming platforms have revolutionized entertainment, creating new ways for people to interact with content. Many celebrities started live streaming during COVID-19 through platforms like Instagram, YouTube, and TikTok, offering an alternate form of entertainment when concerts were postponed. Live streaming and recording allow for fans to communicate with these artists through chats and likes.

=== View recommendation ===
Most streaming services feature a recommender system for viewing based on each user's view history in conjunction with all viewers' aggregated view histories. Rather than focusing on subjective categorization of content by content curators, there is an assumption that, with the immensity of data collected on viewing habits, the choices of those who are first to view content can be algorithmically extrapolated to the totality of the user base, with increasing probabilistic accuracy as to the likelihood of their choosing and enjoying the recommended content as more data is collected.

== Applications and marketing ==
Useful and typical applications of streaming are, for example, long video lectures performed online. An advantage of this presentation is that these lectures can be very long, although they can always be interrupted or repeated at arbitrary places. Streaming enables new content marketing concepts. For example, the Berlin Philharmonic Orchestra sells Internet live streams of whole concerts instead of several CDs or similar fixed media in their Digital Concert Hall using YouTube for trailers. These online concerts are also spread over a lot of different places, including cinemas at various places on the globe. A similar concept is used by the Metropolitan Opera in New York. There is also a livestream from the International Space Station. In video entertainment, video streaming platforms like Netflix, Hulu, and Disney+ are mainstream elements of the media industry.

Marketers have found many opportunities offered by streaming media and the platforms that offer them, especially in light of the significant increase in the use of streaming media during COVID lockdowns from 2020 onwards. While revenue and placement of traditional advertising continued to decrease, digital marketing increased by 15% in 2021, with digital media and search representing 65% of the expenditures.

A case study commissioned by the WIPO indicates that streaming services attract advertising budgets with the opportunities provided by interactivity and the use of data from users, resulting in personalization on a mass scale with content marketing. Targeted marketing is expanding with the use of artificial intelligence, in particular programmatic advertisement, a tool that helps advertisers decide their campaign parameters and whether they are interested in buying advertising space online or not. One example of advertising space acquisition is Real-Time Bidding (RTB).

== Challenges ==
=== Copyright issues ===
For over-the-top media service (OTT) platforms, the original content captures additional subscribers. This presents copyright issues and the potential for international exploitation through streaming, widespread use of standards, and metadata in digital files. The WIPO has indicated several basic copyright issues arising for those pursuing work in the film and music industries in the era of streaming.

Streaming copyrighted content can involve making infringing copies of the works in question. The recording and distribution of streamed content is also an issue for many companies that rely on revenue based on views or attendance.

=== Greenhouse gas emissions ===
The net greenhouse gas emissions from streaming music were estimated at between 0.2 and 0.35 million metric tons CO2eq (between 200,000 and 340,000 long tons; 220,000 and 390,000 short tons) per year in the United States, by a 2019 study. This was an increase from emissions in the pre-digital music period, which were estimated at "0.14 million metric tons (140,000 long tons; 150,000 short tons) in 1977, 0.136 million (134,000 long tons; 150,000 short tons) in 1988, and 0.157 million (155,000 long tons; 173,000 short tons) in 2000." However, this is far less than other everyday activities such as eating. For example greenhouse gas emissions in the United States from beef cattle (burping of ruminants only - not including their manure) were 129 million metric tons (127 million long tons; 142 million short tons) in 2019.

A 2021 study claimed that, based on the amount of data transmitted, one hour of streaming or videoconferencing "emits 150–1,000 grams (5–35 oz) of carbon dioxide ... requires 2–12 liters (0.4–2.6 imp gal; 0.5–3.2 U.S. gal) of water and demands a land area adding up to about the size of an iPad Mini." The study suggests that turning the camera off during video calls can reduce the greenhouse gas and water use footprints by 96%, and that an 86% reduction is possible by using standard definition rather than high definition when streaming content with apps such as Netflix or Hulu. However, another study estimated a relatively low amount of 36 grams per hour (1.3 ounces per hour), and concluded that watching a Netflix video for half an hour emitted only the same amount as driving a gasoline-fuelled car for about 100 meters (330 ft), so not a significant amount.

One way to decrease greenhouse gas emissions associated with streaming music is to make data centers carbon neutral by converting to electricity produced from renewable sources. On an individual level, the purchase of a physical CD may be more environmentally friendly if it is to be played more than 27 times. Another option for reducing energy use is downloading the music for offline listening to reduce the need for streaming over distance. The Spotify service has a built-in local cache to reduce the necessity of repeating song streams.

== See also ==
- Comparison of music streaming services
- Comparison of streaming media software
- Comparison of video hosting services
- Content delivery platform
- Digital television
- Directive on Copyright in the Digital Single Market
- Internet Protocol television
- Geo-blocking
- List of streaming media services
- List of streaming media systems
- M3U playlists
- National Streaming Day
- Over-the-top media service
- P2PTV
- Protection of Broadcasts and Broadcasting Organizations Treaty
- Smart TV
- Stream ripping
- Video over cellular
