= RealNetworks =

American technology company

RealNetworks LLC

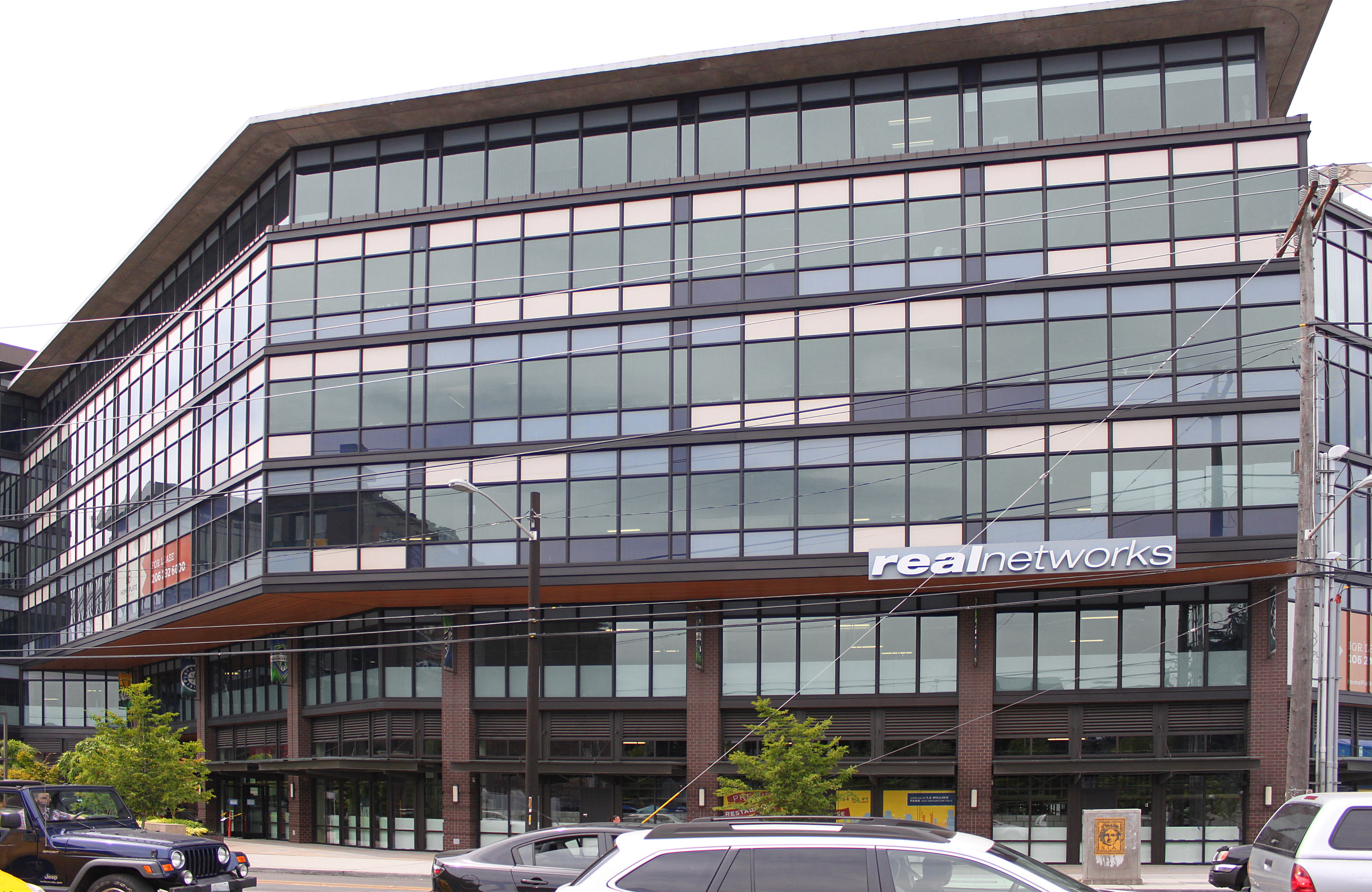
- Headquarters at Home Plate Center in Seattle
- Formerly: Progressive Networks (1994–1997); RealNetworks, Inc. (1997–2023)
- Type: Private
- Traded as: Nasdaq: RNWK
- Industry: Software
- Founded: 1994; 32 years ago
- Founders: Rob Glaser; Phil Barrett; Andy Sharpless; Stephen Buerkle
- Headquarters: Home Plate Center, Seattle, Washington, United States
- Key people: Rob Glaser (Chairman and CEO)
- Products: RealAudio; RealDownloader; RealDVD; RealPlayer; RealArcade; RealPlayer Converter; Real SuperPass; RealPlayer Trimmer; RealTimes; RealVideo; Helix; Rinse; Unifi
- Revenue: ▼US$156.2 million (2014)
- Net income: ▼US$7.18 million (2014)
- Number of employees: 735 (March 2026)
- Divisions: GameHouse
- ASN: 11922
- Website: realnetworks.com

RealNetworks LLC is an American technology company and provider of Internet streaming media delivery software and services based in Seattle, Washington. The company also provides subscription-based online entertainment services and mobile entertainment and messaging services.

== History ==
RealNetworks (then known as Progressive Networks) was founded in 1994 by Rob Glaser, an ex-Microsoft executive, and a management team including Phil Barrett, Andy Sharpless, and Stephen Buerkle. The original goal of the company was to provide a distribution channel for politically progressive content. It evolved into a technology venture to leverage the Internet as an alternative distribution medium for audio broadcasts. Progressive Networks became RealNetworks in September 1997, in advance of the company's initial public offering (IPO) in October 1997 when shares of the company started trading on Nasdaq as "RNWK".

RealNetworks were pioneers in the streaming media markets and broadcast one of the earlier audio events over the Internet, a baseball game between the New York Yankees and Seattle Mariners on September 5, 1995. They announced streaming video technology in 1997. According to some accounts, by 2000 more than 85% of streaming content on the Internet was in the Real format.

Despite this success, problems arose because RealNetworks's primary business model depended upon the sale of streaming media server software, and Microsoft and Apple were giving those products away. As servers from Microsoft and Apple became more capable, Real's server sales inevitably eroded.

In RealNetworks, Inc. v. Streambox, Inc. in January 2000, RealNetworks filed an injunction against Streambox, Inc. regarding that company's product designed to convert Real Audio (.rm) formatted files to other formats. On December 4, 2001, the company was to launch the first coordinated effort to sell and deliver music from major record labels over the Internet, part of a broader initiative by the company to develop subscription Internet services aimed at Web users with fast Internet connections. In 2002, a strategic alliance was formed between RealNetworks and Sony Corporation to expand collaboration. In October 2005, Microsoft agreed to pay RealNetworks $460 million to settle an antitrust lawsuit.

In August 2003, RealNetworks acquired Listen.com's Rhapsody music service, and renamed it RealRhapsody. It offered streaming music downloads for a monthly fee. In January 2004, RealNetworks announced the RealPlayer Music Store, featuring digital rights management (DRM) restricted music in the AAC file format. After some initial tries to push their own DRM scheme (named Helix DRM) onto all device manufacturers with the Creative Zen Xtra and the Sansa e200r as the only existing compliant devices, they sparked controversy by introducing a technology called Harmony that allowed their music to play on iPods as well as Microsoft Windows Media Audio DRM-equipped devices using a "wrapper" that would convert Helix DRM into the two other target DRM schemes.

Real Networks acquired Dutch game company Zylom for $21 million in February 2006. It became part of GameHouse. Glaser left RealNetworks in early 2010 and returned in July 2012.

On April 6, 2010, Rhapsody was spun off from RealNetworks. In July 2013, RealNetworks acquired Slingo for $15.6 million. The company introduced a mobile phone app called Listen in April 2014 that plays custom ringtones to those calling the user's phone.

On December 21, 2022, RealNetworks was taken private by Glaser.

== Corporate governance ==
RealNetworks has its headquarters in Seattle, Washington, in the Home Plate Center building in SoDo across from T-Mobile Park, sharing the building with local television station KING-TV and Logic 20/20 Consulting.

Notable RealNetworks employees have included Alex Alben; the first Chief Privacy Officer of Washington State; Tony Fadell, the inventor of the iPod; musician Daniel House; Philip Rosedale, the founder of Linden Lab; Maria Cantwell, a U.S. Senator from Washington; and Sujal Patel and Paul Mikesell, the founders of Isilon.

The domain real.com attracted at least 67 million visitors annually by 2008, according to a Compete.com study.

== Products and services ==
=== SAFR ===
Launched by RealNetworks on July 17, 2018, SAFR – Secure Accurate Facial Recognition, is a machine learning facial recognition platform. The SAFR platform was updated in 2020 with COVID-19 response features, including the ability to detect whether a person is wearing a mask and identify people wearing masks with 98.85 percent accuracy. On April 27, 2021, SAFR received a grant from the US Air Force to develop its AI-powered analytics for rescue missions, perimeter protection and domestic search operations.

=== Kontxt ===
In 2017, RealNetworks launched Kontxt, a product that offers management of text messaging in mobile networks. It identifies the content of the message and sorts it into categories to determine which ones are more important, and prioritize message delivery. In March 2021, RealNetworks unveiled KONTXT for Voice to identify and stop scam robocalls.

=== RealTimes (formerly RealPlayer Cloud) ===
RealNetworks on September 24, 2013, launched RealPlayer Cloud, a service that adds the ability to share videos recorded on smartphones and tablets. RealPlayer Cloud ties into the existing RealPlayer; however, it also has a Web app and apps for Android, iOS and Roku. The service has 2GB of free cloud storage and more storage for a monthly fee. It was renamed to RealTimes on May 19, 2015, with a new focus on creating and sharing "Stories"—video collages of users' personal photos and videos, set to background music.

=== GameHouse ===
RealNetworks entered the computer game market in October 2001 with RealArcade, a PC game distribution application that allows users to play casual video games for free for 60 minutes, then decide if they want to purchase them. Many of the games were developed by GameHouse, which RealNetworks acquired for $35.6 million in 2004. In 2010, RealNetworks re-branded its games division under the name Gamehouse. It began focusing on social games, such as Facebook applets, and in 2013 acquired casual casino games company, Slingo, for $15.6 million.

=== RealDVD ===
On September 30, 2008, RealNetworks launched a new product called RealDVD. The software allows any user to save a copy of a DVD movie they own. The company was later found to have violated the Digital Millennium Copyright Act and RealNetworks' contract with the DVD Copy Control Association, as the software also allowed anyone to save a movie they do not legally own. (See RealNetworks, Inc. v. DVD Copy Control Ass'n, Inc.). The product's distribution was barred by a court injunction.

=== Real Alternative ===
Real Alternative is a discontinued software bundle that allows users to play RealMedia files without installing RealPlayer. The last version, 2.02, was released on February 19, 2010. It included Media Player Classic.

Beginning in 2010, RealNetworks sued Hilbrand Edskes, a 26-year-old Dutch webmaster, for having inserted hyperlinks to Real Alternative on his site www.codecpack.nl. RealNetworks alleges that Real Alternative is a reverse engineered package.

In November 2011, RealNetworks' case against Edskes was dismissed and RealNetworks was ordered to pay him €48,000 in damages. Details of the case and judgement have been published. RealNetworks appealed the case in 2013, this time alleging that Edskes was after all involved in uploading Real Alternatives. Edskes countered that while his automated script did upload Real Alternatives, the web server was deliberately configured to keep the file unavailable to public. He audited the uploads and deleted Real Alternatives before he was raided in February 17, 2010. Therefore, he was never committed unauthorized distribution.

=== Helix ===
Helix is a suite of streaming media software and services intended for digital TV set-top boxes, mobile devices, as well as QuickTime, Flash and other programs. It includes the Helix open-source code and the Helix Universal Server, which hosts, distributes and manages digital rights for multimedia content. Helix competes with the Windows Media 9 Series from Microsoft, but has a greater emphasis on open-source. Helix was announced in July 2002. Support for mobile devices was added in November 2005. It was discontinued in October 2014.

=== Subscription services ===
In 2000, one of the initial products, the download manager RealDownload, was already used for pushing small software, such as games, to subscribers' computers. On top of the subscription for RealDownload and using its RealVideo streaming technology, a service called GoldPass, including unlimited access for video snippets from ABC and movie previews, was offered to registered users for a monthly $10 fee. More content was added through deals with CBS for the reality show Big Brother and NBA basketball.

=== RealDownloader ===
RealDownloader is a freemium download manager by RealNetworks that downloads embedded Internet videos in multiple formats including MOV and FLV from sites such as YouTube, CollegeHumor, Facebook, Funny or Die and Dailymotion. This software utility lets users share downloaded videos on social networks and transfer them to their mobile devices.

=== Other products and technologies ===
- RealAudio, a compressed audio format
- RealPlayer, a media player
- RealVideo, a compressed video format
- Rinse, a digital music library cleanup tool
- Unifi, a personal cloud media service
- Mobile entertainment and messaging services for mobile carriers

== See also ==
- Trymedia
- United States v. ASCAP
