= Tunstall =

Tunstall or Tunstal may refer to:

== Place names ==
=== Australia ===
- Tunstall, former name of Tuncester, New South Wales

=== Canada ===
- Tunstall, Saskatchewan

=== United Kingdom ===
- Tunstall, East Riding of Yorkshire
- Tunstall, Kent
- Tunstall, Lancashire
- Tunstall, Norfolk, in the parish of Halvergate
- Tunstall, North Yorkshire
- Tunstall, Stafford, near to Eccleshall
- Tunstall, Staffordshire, one of the six towns of Stoke-on-Trent
- Tunstall, Suffolk
- Tunstall, Sunderland
- Tunstall, Devon, near Dartmouth, see Townstal

=== United States ===
- Tunstall, Virginia

== People ==
- Arthur Tunstall (1922–2016), Australian and international sport administrator
- Cuthbert Tunstall (1474–1559), English bishop and scholar
- Dori Tunstall (born 1972), American anthropologist
- Fred Tunstall (1897–1971), English footballer (Sheffield United, England national team)
- John Tunstall (usher), 17th-century English courtier
- John Tunstall (1853–1878), New Mexico (USA) rancher of Lincoln County War fame
- Kate Tunstall (born 1970), British scholar of French literature and interim Provost at Worcester College, Oxford
- KT Tunstall (Kate Victoria Tunstall, born 1975), Scottish singer-songwriter
- Loraine Bedsole Bush Tunstall (1879-1953), American child welfare advocate
- Marmaduke Tunstall (1743–1790), English ornithologist
- Martha Goodwin Tunstall (1838-1911), American Unionist, abolitionist and suffragist
- Pete Tunstall (1918-2013), English pilot and World War II German prisoner
- Thomas Tunstall (died 1616), English Roman Catholic priest
- William Tunstall, footballer
- Whitmell P. Tunstall (1810–1854), Virginia (USA) politician
- Tunstall Quarles (1781–1856), United States lawyer and politician
- Douglas Allen Tunstall Jr. (born 1967) (Tiny the Terrible), American professional wrestler and politician

== Other uses ==
- Tunstall coding, for lossless data compression
- Tunstall Healthcare, a digital healthcare company
- Tunstall Priory, Lincolnshire, England
