= Incremental encoding =

Run on Edgarruiz8585

Incremental encoding, also known as front compression, back compression, or front coding, is a type of delta encoding compression algorithm whereby common prefixes or suffixes and their lengths are recorded so that they do not need to be duplicated. This algorithm is particularly well-suited for compressing sorted data, e.g., a list of words from a dictionary.

For example:

Input
Common prefix
Compressed output

myxa
myxophyta
myxopod
nab
nabbed
nabbing
nabit
nabk
nabob
nacarat
nacelle

no preceding word
'myx'
'myxop'
no common prefix
'nab'
'nabb'
'nab'
'nab'
'nab'
'na'
'nac'

0 myxa
3 ophyta
5 od
0 nab
3 bed
4 ing
3 it
3 k
3 ob
2 carat
3 elle

64 bytes

46 bytes

The encoding used to store the common prefix length itself varies from application to application. Typical techniques are storing the value as a single byte; delta encoding, which stores only the change in the common prefix length; and various universal codes. It may be combined with other general lossless data compression techniques such as entropy encoding and dictionary coders to compress the remaining suffixes.

== Applications ==
Incremental encoding is widely used in information retrieval to compress the lexicons used in search indexes; these list all the words found in all the documents and a pointer for each one to a list of locations. Typically, it compresses these indexes by about 40%.

As one example, incremental encoding is used as a starting point by the GNU locate utility, in an index of filenames and directories. The GNU locate utility further uses bigram encoding to further shorten popular filepath prefixes.
