= Hft =

Charitable organization in Bristol, United Kingdom

- Formation: 1962
- Type: Charity
- Purpose: Social Care
- Headquarters: Bristol, BS13
- Region served: England, Wales
- Chief Executive: Stephen Veevers
- Staff: 3200
- Website: www.hft.org.uk

Hft, formerly known as the Home Farm Trust, is a British learning disability charity based in Bristol. It was established in 1962. The parents who established the charity bought Frocester Manor in Gloucestershire as a residential home for their children. The organisation runs small, person-centred residential care homes and supported living services.

Hft is noted for having established the Fusion Model, which is based on the concept of Person-Centred Active Support, engaging people in meaningful activity and relationships as active participants.

In 2019 it is supporting more than 2,900 adults with learning disabilities. Its charity number is 313069

== Locations and services ==
It supports a successful group of 44 people in Flintshire, Tri Ffordd, which produces handcrafted horticultural goods.

In May 2013, it merged with Self Unlimited, another charity set up in the 1960s to provide support for people with learning disabilities.

== Supporters and ambassadors ==
Anne, Princess Royal has been the Royal patron of the charity since 1982.

Other patrons of the charity have included:

- Floella Benjamin
- Martin Clunes
- Ronnie Corbett
- Dame Judi Dench
- Sir David Frost
- Sir Stuart Hampton
- Griff Rhys-Jones
- Maureen Lipman
- The Lord Rix
- Dr Oliver Russell
- Dr Phillipa Russell

== Memberships and accreditations ==
=== Memberships ===
Hft is a member of the following umbrella organisations:

- British Institute of Learning Disabilities (BILD)
- Care and Support Alliance (CSA)
- European Association of Service Providers for Persons with Disabilities (EASPD)
- The European Network for Technology Enhanced Learning in an Inclusive Society (ENTELIS)
- Learning Disability Voices
- Telecare Services Association (TSA)
- Voluntary Organisations Disability Group (VODG)

=== Accreditations ===
Hft has achieved several accreditations and certifications:

- Investors in People: Hft has held the Investors in People accolade since 2002, and achieved Silver accreditation in 2017 and 2020.
- Hft is a Skills For Care Centre of Excellence for its learning and development programme.
- Hft has achieved compliance with the Energy Saving Opportunity Scheme (ESOS) to show its commitment to reducing energy use and lowering its associated carbon footprint
- Hft is certified as conforming to the requirements of the OHSAS 18001:2007 workplace safety regulation
- Hft has achieved the Cyber Essentials Plus accreditation

=== Codes of Conduct ===
Hft is a signatory to a number of different codes of practice and commitments designed to encourage best practice in the social care sector:

- Hft is registered with the Fundraising Regulator and has committed to adhering to the regulator's Code of Fundraising Practise and the Fundraising Promise.
- Hft has signed up to the Driving Up Quality Code, which outlines good fundamental practices and behaviour that organisations that support people with learning disabilities need to be committed to.
- Hft is a Disability Confident Employer.

== Campaigns and research ==
Hft produces an annual Sector Pulse Check report on organisations providing social care that aims to provide a yearly snapshot of the financial health of the sector.

In June 2019 it submitted evidence to the Low Pay Commission that social care staff are being commissioned at significantly lower rates of pay, compared to local authorities. Social care is typically commissioned at the National Living Wage. The Department of Health and Social Care pays even its lowest paid staff significantly more.

It produced a report with Tunstall Healthcare which was launched in the House of Lords in 2019 highlighting the untapped potential of assistive technology in social care which was welcomed by the Voluntary Organisations Disability Group.

In July 2019 it called for an end to "perverse" commissioning practices that are "negatively impacting" productivity and financial stability in the adult social care sector. It said that input-based by-hour contracts gave "no incentive" for providers to innovate or deliver anything other than one hour of support.

== Books ==
- Peck, Bill (2008). A History of the Home Farm Trust 1962 - 2008. Bristol: The Home Farm Trust Limited. ISBN 978-0-9561178-0-9.
