= Objective vision =

Objective Vision
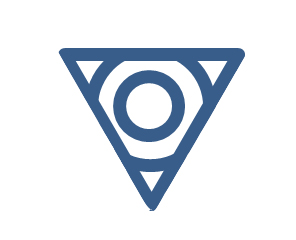
- Developer: En. Michael Bidollahkhany
- Release: 2016 AUG. 15
- Stable release: v. 0.9.2017FEB26
- Written in: Algorithms implemented with C++ and C# Console & V. Lab. versions: C#, Delphi
- Operating system: Microsoft Windows XP (and later); x86-64, x86 .Net framework v. 4+
- License: MIT License
- Repository: https://github.com/michaelkhany/Objective-Vision

Objective Vision (Object Oriented Visionary) is a project mainly aimed at real-time computer vision and simulation vision of living creatures. it has three sections containing an open-source library of programming functions for using inside the projects, Virtual laboratory for scholars to check the application of functions directly and by command-line code for external and instant access, and the research section consists of paperwork and libraries to expand the scientific prove of works.

== Background ==
The process has been used in the OVC libraries is as same as what's happening when living see a picture, and it's designed to give the researchers to experience the brain's visual cortex most close simulation for picture perception. The OVC was designed to work as a simulated visual cortex that has a critical job in processing and classify the objects to make it easier to work with pictures and graphical perception and processing. The human brain is much more aware of how it solves complex problems such as playing chess or solving algebra equations, which is why computer programmers have had so much success building machines that emulate this type of activity. but when the whole process is still a riddle that how the entities visionary system works. The project was simulated the visionary system by how it starts to convert the signals to image(actually the edges and colors) and then recognizing the shapes to find a relation between brain's information and image. The Objective Visionary system actually is concentrating on the separable sections, this separation gives the application visionary system the excellence processing result, because with this method the system do not waste much time on processing non significant sections and signals. this operation in the Objective Vision project called objective processing and because the O.V. mission is focused on human visionary simulation, so the developer refers with Objective Vision.

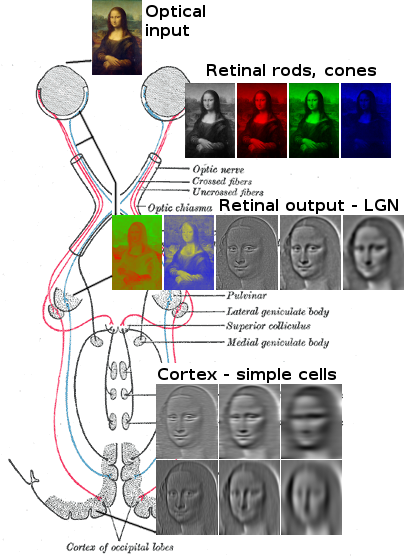
Scheme of the optic tract with image being decomposed on the way, up to simple cortical cells (simplified)

== History ==
Objective-Vision is a Human (Natural) Visionary simulation Project developed by Michael Bidollahkhany. Following an explosion of interest during the 21st century were characterized by the maturing of the field and the significant growth of active applications; simulation of visionary systems, visionary based autonomous vehicle guidance, medical imaging (2D and 3D) and automatic surveillance are the most rapidly developing areas. This progress can be seen in an increasing number of software and hardware products on the market, as well as in a number of digital image processing software and APIs and also machine vision courses offered at universities worldwide. Therefore, the OVC project has been released as a research software project in 2016. One of important parts of this project was O.V.C. (Objective Vision Class library), that was designed to able companies and scientists to use the brain's most likely functionalities as visionary libraries to simplify and accelerate the image processing algorithms developments. The project started under MIT copyright license, but since 2018 the project continued as classified based on sponsors opinion.

== The Algorithm ==
As developers claimed the algorithm used in the class library and developer's kit of project has been developed based on natural visionary system, and the functionalities containing image processing, optimization and labeling etc. are mostly upgraded and near techniques. Suppose that we've a picture of a jungle, or somewhere else, with this library developer will be able to manipulate not only the pixel of images for data extraction, but automatically based on which algorithm is used and image quality, he can manipulate directly a list of objects, same pixels and every data project needs to have, said the developer in his lecture answering how the algorithm works.

=== Viewpoint ===
For long times digital image processing and storing, was actually by processing just pixels; this Project tries to present a new kind of image processing and even storing, "objective vision" or "object-oriented visionary" is called. This project officially launched in May 2016, with the aim of making more adaptation between Computer Vision (Include Visionary, Digital image processing, discernment and even Perception) and Human Visual System; about development of the project: "...so we decided to research on Human Vision System, besides we worked on Artificial Retinal image processing and new visionary optimization unit(Presented at Istanbul Technical University Conference(Turkey 2015-2016)) and grew our research to Visionary CORTEX of Brain", Michael Bidollahkhany said.

== Applications ==
The OVC application areas include:

- 2D and 3D feature toolkits
- Egomotion estimation
- Human–computer interaction (HCI)
- Mobile robotics
- Motion understanding
- Object identification
- Segmentation and recognition
- Stereopsis stereo vision: depth perception from two cameras
- Structure from motion (SFM)
- Motion tracking

== Programming language ==
In first initial release of Objective Visionary Project the algorithm has been written in C++ and C#, and the virtual laboratory has been developed in C# and Delphi. Based on developers last lecture since the second release the complete algorithm has been re-written in C# based on .Net Core 1.0 to make it easier to work on different operating systems.

== See also ==
- Human visual system model
- Visual system
- Machine Vision
- Image processing
- OpenCV
