= Grammar-based code =

Lossless data compression algorithm

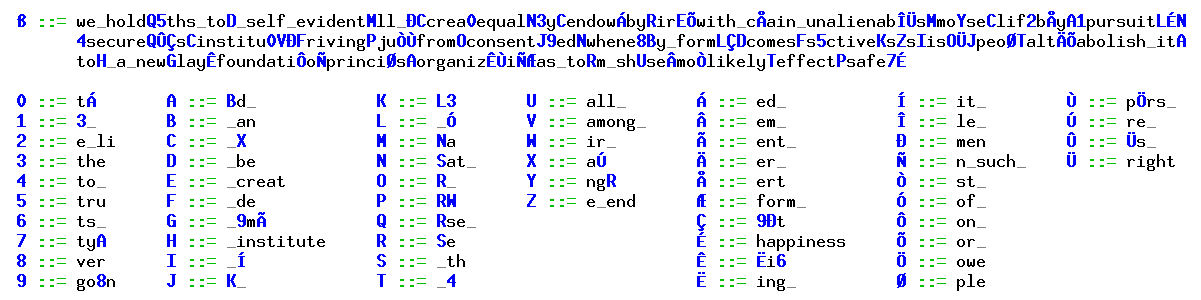
Straight-line grammar (with start symbol ß) for the second sentence of the United States Declaration of Independence. Each blue character denotes a nonterminal symbol; they were obtained from a gzip-compression of the sentence.

Grammar-based codes or grammar-based compression are compression algorithms based on the idea of constructing a context-free grammar (CFG) for the string to be compressed. Examples include universal lossless data compression algorithms. To compress a data sequence $x = x_1 \cdots x_n$, a grammar-based code transforms $x$ into a context-free grammar $G$. The problem of finding a smallest grammar for an input sequence (smallest grammar problem) is known to be NP-hard, so many grammar-transform algorithms are proposed from theoretical and practical viewpoints. Generally, the produced grammar $G$ is further compressed by statistical encoders like arithmetic coding.

== Examples and characteristics ==
The class of grammar-based codes is very broad. It includes block codes, the multilevel pattern matching (MPM) algorithm, variations of the incremental parsing Lempel-Ziv code, and many other new universal lossless compression algorithms. Grammar-based codes are universal in the sense that they can achieve asymptotically the entropy rate of any stationary, ergodic source with a finite alphabet.

== Practical algorithms ==
The compression programs of the following are available from external links.

- Sequitur is a classical grammar compression algorithm that sequentially translates an input text into a CFG, and then the produced CFG is encoded by an arithmetic coder.
- Re-Pair is a greedy algorithm using the strategy of most-frequent-first substitution. The compressive performance is powerful, although the main memory space requirement is very large.
- GLZA, which constructs a grammar that may be reducible, i.e., contain repeats, where the entropy-coding cost of "spelling out" the repeats is less than the cost creating and entropy-coding a rule to capture them. (In general, the compression-optimal SLG is not irreducible, and the Smallest Grammar Problem is different from the actual SLG compression problem.)

== See also ==
- Dictionary coder
- Grammar induction
- Straight-line grammar
