= Brandon Trust =

United Kingdom charitable organization

- Formation: March 1994; 32 years ago
- Type: Charitable organization
- Legal status: Operational
- Purpose: Learning Disability Support Services
- Headquarters: Bradley Stoke, Bristol
- Location: Great Park Road, Almondsbury Business Centre, Bradley Stoke, Bristol, BS32 4QH
- Region served: England
- Chair: Mark Stupples
- Chief Executive: Helen England
- Website: www.brandontrust.org

Brandon Trust is a United Kingdom charitable organisation that supports children, young people, and adults with learning disabilities and autistic people.

Founded in 1994 through the merger of the Buttress Trust and South Avon Housing Association, the charity provides services across the south west of England, Warwickshire, and London. Steve Bennett was the first Chief Executive.

Its work includes supported living, residential care, community support, short breaks, children's services, and a range of social enterprise businesses and charity shops.

As of 2025, Brandon Trust supports approximately 1,600 people and employs over 2,000 staff. The organisation is registered with the Care Quality Commission and Ofsted and is headquartered at Draycott House, Almondsbury Business Centre, Bradley Stoke, Bristol.

== Advocacy and Campaigns ==
Brandon Trust is a member of the Voluntary Organisations Disability Group and is a founding member of the More Than a Provider collaborative, which puts the needs of disabled people at the heart of social care. More Than a Provider campaigns for long-term reform and sustainable funding for social care in England.

The organisation has contributed to sector-wide discussions on social care policy, funding pressures, and the rights of people with learning disabilities and autistic people. Former Chief Executive, Lucy Hurst-Brown, was a regular contributor to national media coverage relating to social care, workforce challenges, and the experiences of disabled people.

== History ==
Brandon Trust was formed in March 1994 following the merger of the Buttress Trust and the South Avon Housing Association. The charity was established during a period of transition away from long stay institutions toward community-based support for people with learning disabilities.

Throughout the late 1990s and 2000s, Brandon Trust expanded its supported living services, day opportunities, and employment programmes. The organisation also developed a number of social enterprises designed to provide vocational training and community engagement.

In 2024, Brandon Trust marked its 30th anniversary and published a historical timeline documenting its growth from an organisation of around 25 staff to one employing more than 2,000 people and supporting approximately 1,600 individuals across multiple regions.

== Purpose and Mission ==
Brandon Trust's stated purpose is to enable people with learning disabilities and autistic people to "live free" and to live life in the way they choose. The charity focuses on personalised support, removing barriers to independence, and promoting inclusion in local communities. Its work includes supporting people to access housing, employment, education, social opportunities, and community life.

== Services ==
Brandon Trust provides a wide range of services for children, young people, and adults, including: supported living, residential care, short breaks, community and outreach support, children's play schemes and family support, transition support for young people, social enterprises, including cafés, charity shops, a care farm, pottery and ceramics studios, vocational training projects, and employment and skills development programmes.

== Social Enterprises ==
Brandon Trust runs several social enterprises that provide work experience, training, and community engagement opportunities for people with learning disabilities and autistic people. These include retail boutiques, ceramics and creative studios, a care farm offering horticulture and animal care activities, community cafés, and supported employment projects, including NHS transplant kit packaging. These enterprises aim to develop skills, promote independence, and increase access to meaningful work.

== Governance and Leadership ==
Brandon Trust is governed by a board of trustees. As of 2025, the Chair is Mark Stupples, and the Chief Executive is Helen England. The charity is registered with the Charity Commission (number 801571) and regulated by the Care Quality Commission and Ofsted.

Current chief executive, Helen England, previously contributed to health‑sector research, including co‑authoring a National Institute for Health Research study on variations in out‑of‑hours end‑of‑life care provision across England and Scotland, and a peer‑reviewed systematic review examining which features of primary care influence unscheduled secondary care use.

== Financial Information ==
According to the Charity Commission, Brandon Trust reported the following financial results for the year ending 31 March 2025: Total income £77.58 million, Total expenditure £77.37 million.

Income is primarily derived from charitable activities, with additional contributions from donations, legacies, and trading activities.

== Publications ==
Brandon Trust's 2013 Annual Report won a Third Sector Award.

In 2014, Brandon Trust's 20th anniversary report Finding Freedom launched at the Learning Disability Today London conference on 27 November 2014, warns that the vast majority of people with learning disabilities remain invisible in our society despite more than 20 years of 'care in the community.' Research commissioned by the charity found that 64% of people surveyed said people with learning disabilities were not visible in communities. This is despite an estimated 1.5 million people with learning disabilities living in the UK. Of those who do know someone with a learning disability, just a quarter said they would describe that person as a friend.

Drawing on her experience of three decades working in the disability sector, former Brandon Trust CEO, Lucy Hurst-Brown, was invited to speak to Radio 4's Four Thought programme during the 2016 Hay Festival where she debated the issue of people with learning disabilities being 'invisible' and 'lonely citizens' in society, with little or no voice. The script was broadcast on BBC Radio 4's Four Thought programme on 29 June, and has attracted much feedback within the social care sector. The full podcast is on the BBC website.
