= CCSDS 122.0-B-1 =

Image compression standard

CCSDS 122.0 is a CCSDS lossless to lossy image compression standard originally released in November 2005. The encoder consists of two parts—a discrete wavelet transform transform coder followed by a bitplane encoder on the similar lines as Embedded Zerotree Wavelet by Shapiro.

== Encoder ==
CCSDS 122.0 makes use of a three-level two-dimensional discrete wavelet transform (DWT) using a biorthogonal 9/7 tap filters, followed by a bit-plane encoder. It has some design commonalities with ICER and JPEG 2000 that use similar wavelet coding schemes.

The transform (DWT) can be computed using either floating-point or integer arithmetic. The integer transform uses non-linear approximation of the 9/7 wavelet and it is used in the lossless coding scheme. The floating-point DWT contributes to the lossy scheme.

== Known flaws ==
This compression format is sensitive to bit corruption in the deep space channel, but it is unclear if this sensitivity is greater than ICER or JPEG 2000.

The effects of a single bit error can propagate to corrupt reconstructed image data to the end of the affected segment. Measures must be taken to minimize the number of potential bit errors on the transmission link.

There is a known partial fix, but it is not mandatory.

The transport mechanism for the delivery of the encoded bitstream shall support, in the event of a bit error, the ability to relocate the header of the next segment.

In case the encoded bitstream is to be transmitted over a CCSDS space link, several protocols that have built in error correction and detection can be used to transfer the sequence of segments (the highest coding level in this image format).

Unlike ICER that has been used in products and projects outside the space agencies, this image compression system has no history of use outside the space agencies.

== Versions ==
date	CCSDS	ISO
November 2005	CCSDS 122.0-B-1	ISO 26868:2009
September 2017	CCSDS 122.0-B-2	
