= Locate (Unix) =

Utility to find files on Unix systems

locate
- Initial release: 1982; 43 years ago
- Operating system: Unix and Unix-like
- Type: Command

locate is a Unix utility which serves to find files on filesystems. It searches through a prebuilt database of files generated by the updatedb command or by a daemon and compressed using incremental encoding. It operates significantly faster than find, but requires regular updating of the database. This sacrifices overall efficiency (because of the regular interrogation of filesystems even when no user needs information) and absolute accuracy (since the database does not update in real time) for significant speed improvements, particularly on very large filesystems.

== Implementations of locate ==
locate was first created in 1982. The BSD and GNU Findutils versions derive from the original implementation. A locate command is also included in MacOS.

mlocate (Merging Locate) and the earlier slocate (Secure Locate) use a restricted-access database, only showing filenames accessible to the user.

GNU findutils' locate database can be built either in the traditional way (as a world-readable database of files accessible by everybody) or in the manner of slocate, in which the database contains more files, but the output is filtered to show the user only the names of files they have access to.

plocate uses posting lists. Like mlocate and slocate, it only shows files if find would list it. Compared to mlocate, it is much faster, and its index is smaller.

== Performance differences between find and locate ==
When find searches a large file system, it performs many system calls and reads from many locations on the storage media. This is often quite slow. The locate command, by comparison, generally reads a compressed database and lists the matching files. So locate generally performs much less I/O per match. However, find can operate faster if you only want to search a small directory (not the whole file system).

== See also ==
- mdfind related command in MacOS
