= Motion coding =

In video compression technology, motion coding is a technique that can be viewed as extensions of the standard block-matching techniques in other MPEG standard to image sequences of arbitrary shape.

Advanced motion compensation such as overlapped motion compensation and coding of motion vectors for 8×8 blocks, could be used.

== See also ==
- Motion compensation
