= Smallest grammar problem =

In data compression and the theory of formal languages, the smallest grammar problem is the problem of finding the smallest context-free grammar that generates a given string of characters (but no other string). The size of a grammar is defined by some authors as the number of symbols on the right side of the production rules. Others also add the number of rules to that. A grammar that generates only a single string, as required for the solution to this problem, is called a straight-line grammar.

Every binary string of length $n$ has a grammar of length $O(n/\log n)$, as expressed using big O notation. For binary de Bruijn sequences, no better length is possible.

The (decision version of the) smallest grammar problem is NP-complete. It can be approximated in polynomial time to within a logarithmic approximation ratio; more precisely, the ratio is $O(\log\tfrac{n}{g})$ where $n$ is the length of the given string and $g$ is the size of its smallest grammar. It is hard to approximate to within a constant approximation ratio. An improvement of the approximation ratio to $o(\log n/\log\log n)$ would also improve certain algorithms for approximate addition chains.

== See also ==
- Grammar-based code
- Kolmogorov complexity
- Lossless data compression
