= Tunstall Healthcare =

Digital healthcare company

Tunstall Group
- Trade name: Tunstall Healthcare
- Industry: Care Technology; Health Technology
- Founded: 1957
- Headquarters: Doncaster
- Area served: Worldwide
- Number of employees: 3,000 staff
- Website: https://www.tunstall.com/

Tunstall Healthcare is a technology company established in 1957 which specialises in digital health and care services. Its head office is in Doncaster, England. It has around 3,000 staff in 19 countries, and 5 million connected end users worldwide. It is regarded as a key player in the telehealth market. The Chief Executive Officer is Emil Peters.

It acquired American Medical Alert Corporation in December 2011.

It sold Tunstall Americas to Connect America.com in January 2019 as part of its move towards a technology-enabled managed services business model.

It is working with Telefónica to provide remote patient management systems and services to boost its capabilities in preventive care at home for people with chronic conditions.

It produced a report with the charity hft which was launched in the House of Lords in 2019 highlighting the untapped potential of assistive technology in social care which was welcomed by the Voluntary Organisations Disability Group.

In 2021 it acquired Secuvita, a technology solution provider based in the Netherlands with 70,000 users. In 2022 it bought BeWo Unternehmensgruppe, a German company.
