= Set redundancy compression =

In computer science and information theory, set redundancy compression are methods of data compression that exploits redundancy between individual data groups of a set, usually a set of similar images. It is wide used on medical and satellital images. The main methods are min-max differential, min-max predictive and centroid method.

== Methods ==
=== Min-max differential ===
In the min-max differential (or MMD), for each position (pixel) selects the highest or the lowest. And then in each image is stored the difference of each of their positions with respect to the value previously selected.
