= Set partitioning in hierarchical trees =

Image compression algorithm

Set partitioning in hierarchical trees (SPIHT) is an image compression algorithm that exploits the inherent similarities across the subbands in a wavelet decomposition of an image. The algorithm was developed by Brazilian engineer Amir Said with William A. Pearlman in 1996.

== General description ==
The algorithm codes the most important wavelet transform coefficients first, and transmits the bits so that an increasingly refined copy of the original image can be obtained progressively.

== See also ==
- Embedded Zerotrees of Wavelet transforms (EZW)
- Wavelet
