= Recursive grammar =

Computer science and linguistics concept relating to non-terminal production

In computer science, a grammar is informally called a recursive grammar if it contains production rules that are recursive, meaning that expanding a non-terminal according to these rules can eventually lead to a string that includes the same non-terminal again. Otherwise it is called a non-recursive grammar.

For example, a grammar for a context-free language is left recursive if there exists a non-terminal symbol A that can be put through the production rules to produce a string with A (as the leftmost symbol). All types of grammars in the Chomsky hierarchy can be recursive and it is recursion that allows the production of infinite sets of words.

== Properties ==
A non-recursive grammar can produce only a finite language; and each finite language can be produced by a non-recursive grammar. For example, a straight-line grammar produces just a single word.

A recursive context-free grammar that contains no useless rules necessarily produces an infinite language. This property forms the basis for an algorithm that can test efficiently whether a context-free grammar produces a finite or infinite language.
