= Algorithm BSTW =

Dictionary-based compression algorithm

The Algorithm BSTW is a data compression algorithm, named after its designers, Bentley, Sleator, Tarjan and Wei in 1986. BSTW is a dictionary-based algorithm that uses a move-to-front transform to keep recently seen dictionary entries at the front of the dictionary. Dictionary references are then encoded using any of a number of encoding methods, usually Elias delta coding or Elias gamma coding.
