= Shannon–Fano–Elias coding =

Algorithm for binary prefix code

In information theory, Shannon–Fano–Elias coding is a precursor to arithmetic coding, in which probabilities are used to determine codewords. It is named for Claude Shannon, Robert Fano, and Peter Elias.

== Algorithm description ==
Given a discrete random variable X of ordered values to be encoded, let $p(x)$ be the probability for any x in X. Define a function

$$\bar F(x) = \sum_{x_i < x}p(x_i) + \frac 12 p(x)$$

Algorithm:

For each x in X,

Let Z be the binary expansion of $\bar F(x)$.
Choose the length of the encoding of x, $L(x)$, to be the integer $\left\lceil \log_2 \frac {1}{p(x)} \right\rceil + 1$
Choose the encoding of x, $code(x)$, be the first $L(x)$ most significant bits after the decimal point of Z.

=== Example ===
Let X = {A, B, C, D}, with probabilities p = {1/3, 1/4, 1/6, 1/4}.

For A

$$\bar F(A) = \frac 12 p(A) = \frac 12 \cdot \frac 13 = 0.1666\ldots$$
In binary, Z(A) = 0.0010101010...
$$L(A) = \left\lceil \log_2 \frac 1 \frac 1 3 \right\rceil + 1 = \mathbf 3$$
code(A) is 001

For B

$$\bar F(B) = p(A) + \frac 12 p(B) = \frac 13 + \frac 12 \cdot \frac 14 = 0.4583333\ldots$$
In binary, Z(B) = 0.01110101010101...
$$L(B) = \left\lceil \log_2 \frac 1 \frac 1 4 \right\rceil + 1 = \mathbf 3$$
code(B) is 011

For C

$$\bar F(C) = p(A) + p(B) + \frac 12 p(C) = \frac 13 + \frac 14 + \frac 12 \cdot \frac 16 = 0.66666\ldots$$
In binary, Z(C) = 0.101010101010...
$$L(C) = \left\lceil \log_2 \frac 1 \frac 1 6 \right\rceil + 1 = \mathbf 4$$
code(C) is 1010

For D

$$\bar F(D) = p(A) + p(B) + p(C) + \frac 12 p(D) = \frac 13 + \frac 14 + \frac 16 + \frac 12 \cdot \frac 14 = 0.875$$
In binary, Z(D) = 0.111
$$L(D) = \left\lceil \log_2 \frac 1 \frac 1 4 \right\rceil + 1 = \mathbf 3$$
code(D) is 111

== Algorithm analysis ==
=== Prefix code ===
Shannon–Fano–Elias coding produces a binary prefix code, allowing for direct decoding.

Let bcode(x) be the rational number formed by adding a decimal point before a binary code. For example, if code(C) = 1010 then bcode(C) = 0.1010. For all x, if no y exists such that

$$\operatorname{bcode}(x) \le \operatorname{bcode}(y) < \operatorname{bcode}(x) + 2^{-L(x)}$$

then all the codes form a prefix code.

By comparing F to the CDF of X, this property may be demonstrated graphically for Shannon–Fano–Elias coding.

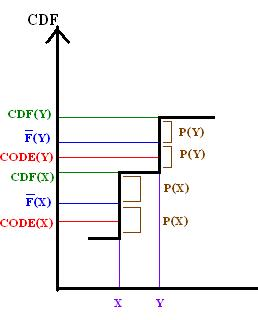

By definition of L it follows that

$$2^{-L(x)} \le \frac 12 p(x)$$

And because the bits after L(y) are truncated from F(y) to form code(y), it follows that

$$\bar F(y) - \operatorname{bcode}(y) \le 2^{-L(y)}$$

thus bcode(y) must be no less than CDF(x).

So the above graph demonstrates that the $\operatorname{bcode}(y) - \operatorname{bcode}(x) > p(x) \ge 2^{-L(x)}$, therefore the prefix property holds.

=== Code length ===
The average code length is $LC(X) = \sum_{x \in X}p(x)L(x) = \sum_{x \in X}p(x) \left(\left\lceil \log_2 \frac {1}{p(x)} \right\rceil + 1\right)$.
Thus for H(X), the entropy of the random variable X,

$$H(X) + 1 \le LC(X) < H(X) + 2$$

Shannon Fano Elias codes from 1 to 2 extra bits per symbol from X than entropy, so the code is not used in practice.

== See also ==
- Shannon–Fano coding
