= Human visual system model =

A human visual system model (HVS model) is used by image processing, video processing and computer vision experts to deal with biological and psychological processes that are not yet fully understood. Such a model is used to simplify the behaviors of what is a very complex system. As our knowledge of the true visual system improves, the model is updated.

Psychovisual study is the study of the psychology of vision.

The human visual system model can produce desired effects in perception and vision. Examples of using an HVS model include color television, lossy compression, and Cathode-ray tube (CRT) television.

Originally, it was thought that color television required too high a bandwidth for the then available technology. Then it was noticed that the color resolution of the HVS was much lower than the brightness resolution; this allowed color to be squeezed into the signal by chroma subsampling.

Another example is lossy image compression, like JPEG. Our HVS model says we cannot see high frequency detail, so in JPEG we can quantize these components without a perceptible loss of quality. Similar concepts are applied in audio compression, where sound frequencies inaudible to humans are band-stop filtered.

Several HVS features are derived from evolution when we needed to defend ourselves or hunt for food. We often see demonstrations of HVS features when we are looking at optical illusions.

== Assumptions about the HVS ==
- Low-pass filter characteristic (limited number of rods in human eye): see Mach bands
- Lack of color resolution (fewer cones in human eye than rods)
- Motion sensitivity
  - More sensitive in peripheral vision
  - Stronger than texture sensitivity, e.g. viewing a camouflaged animal
- Texture stronger than disparity – 3D depth resolution does not need to be so accurate
- Integral Face recognition (babies smile at faces)
  - Depth inverted face looks normal (facial features overrule depth information)
    - Upside down face with inverted mouth and eyes looks normal

== Examples of taking advantage of an HVS model ==
- Flicker frequency of film and television using persistence of vision to fool viewer into seeing a continuous image
- Interlaced television painting half images to give the impression of a higher flicker frequency
- Color television (chrominance at half resolution of luminance corresponding to proportions of rods and cones in eye)
- Image compression (difficult to see higher frequencies more harshly quantized)
- Motion estimation (use luminance and ignore color)
- Watermarking and Steganography

== See also ==
- Psychoacoustics
- Visual system
- Visual perception
- Depth perception
