= Embedded zerotrees of wavelet transforms =

Lossy image compression algorithm

Embedded zerotrees of wavelet transforms (EZW) is a lossy image compression algorithm. At low bit rates, i.e. high compression ratios, most of the coefficients produced by a subband transform (such as the wavelet transform) will be zero, or very close to zero. This occurs because "real world" images tend to contain mostly low frequency information (highly correlated). However where high frequency information does occur (such as edges in the image) this is particularly important in terms of human perception of the image quality, and thus must be represented accurately in any high quality coding scheme.

By considering the transformed coefficients as a tree (or trees) with the lowest frequency coefficients at the root node and with the children of each tree node being the spatially related coefficients in the next higher frequency subband, there is a high probability that one or more subtrees will consist entirely of coefficients which are zero or nearly zero, such subtrees are called zerotrees. Due to this, we use the terms node and coefficient interchangeably, and when we refer to the children of a coefficient, we mean the child coefficients of the node in the tree where that coefficient is located. We use children to refer to directly connected nodes lower in the tree and descendants to refer to all nodes which are below a particular node in the tree, even if not directly connected.

In zerotree based image compression scheme such as EZW and SPIHT, the intent is to use the statistical properties of the trees in order to efficiently code the locations of the significant coefficients. Since most of the coefficients will be zero or close to zero, the spatial locations of the significant coefficients make up a large portion of the total size of a typical compressed image. A coefficient (likewise a tree) is considered significant if its magnitude (or magnitudes of a node and all its descendants in the case of a tree) is above a particular threshold. By starting with a threshold which is close to the maximum coefficient magnitudes and iteratively decreasing the threshold, it is possible to create a compressed representation of an image which progressively adds finer detail. Due to the structure of the trees, it is very likely that if a coefficient in a particular frequency band is insignificant, then all its descendants (the spatially related higher frequency band coefficients) will also be insignificant.

EZW uses four symbols to represent (a) a zerotree root, (b) an isolated zero (a coefficient which is insignificant, but which has significant descendants), (c) a significant positive coefficient and (d) a significant negative coefficient. The symbols may be thus represented by two binary bits. The compression algorithm consists of a number of iterations through a dominant pass and a subordinate pass, the threshold is updated (reduced by a factor of two) after each iteration. The dominant pass encodes the significance of the coefficients which have not yet been found significant in earlier iterations, by scanning the trees and emitting one of the four symbols. The children of a coefficient are only scanned if the coefficient was found to be significant, or if the coefficient was an isolated zero. The subordinate pass emits one bit (the most significant bit of each coefficient not so far emitted) for each coefficient which has been found significant in the previous significance passes. The subordinate pass is therefore similar to bit-plane coding.

There are several important features to note. Firstly, it is possible to stop the compression algorithm at any time and obtain an approximation of the original image, the greater the number of bits received, the better the image. Secondly, due to the way in which the compression algorithm is structured as a series of decisions, the same algorithm can be run at the decoder to reconstruct the coefficients, but with the decisions being taken according to the incoming bit stream. In practical implementations, it would be usual to use an entropy code such as arithmetic code to further improve the performance of the dominant pass. Bits from the subordinate pass are usually random enough that entropy coding provides no further coding gain.

The coding performance of EZW has since been exceeded by SPIHT and its many derivatives.

== Introduction ==
Embedded zerotree wavelet algorithm (EZW) as developed by J. Shapiro in 1993, enables scalable image transmission and decoding. It is based on four key concepts: first, it should be a discrete wavelet transform or hierarchical subband decomposition; second, it should predict the absence of significant information when exploring the self-similarity inherent in images; third, it has entropy-coded successive-approximation quantization, and fourth, it is enabled to achieve universal lossless data compression via adaptive arithmetic coding.

Besides, the EZW algorithm also contains the following features:

1. A discrete wavelet transform which can use a compact multiresolution representation in the image.
2. Zerotree coding which provides a compact multiresolution representation of significance maps.
3. Successive approximation for a compact multiprecision representation of the significant coefficients.
4. A prioritization protocol which the importance is determined by the precision, magnitude, scale, and spatial location of the wavelet coefficients in order.
5. Adaptive multilevel arithmetic coding which is a fast and efficient method for entropy coding strings of symbols.

== Embedded zerotree wavelet coding ==
=== A. Encoding a coefficient of the significance map ===
In a significance map, the coefficients can be represented by the following four different symbols. With using these symbols to represent the image information, the coding will be less complicated.

==== 1. Zerotree root ====
If the magnitude of a coefficient is less than a threshold T, and all its descendants are less than T, then this coefficient is called zerotree root. And if a coefficient has been labeled as zerotree root, it means that all of its descendants are insignificant, so there is no need to label its descendants.

==== 2. Isolated zero ====
If the magnitude of a coefficient is lower than a threshold T, but it still has some significant descendants, then this coefficient is called isolated zero.

==== 3. Positive significant coefficient ====
If the magnitude of a coefficient is greater than a threshold T at level T, and also is positive, than it is a positive significant coefficient.

==== 4. Negative significant coefficient ====
If the magnitude of a coefficient is greater than a threshold T at level T, and also is negative, than it is a negative significant coefficient.

=== B. Defining threshold ===
The threshold used above can be defined as follows.

==== 1. Initial threshold T_{0}, assuming C_{max} is the largest coefficient ====
$$T_0=2^{\lfloor \log_2 C_\mathit{max} \rfloor}$$

==== 2. Threshold T_{i} is iteratively reduced to half of the value of the previous threshold ====
$$T_i = \frac12 T_{i-1}$$

=== C. Scanning order for coefficients ===
Raster scan is used in a way such that no children nodes are scanned before their parent nodes. Also, all coefficients in a given subband are scanned before those of the next subband.

=== D. Two-pass bitplane coding ===
==== (1) Refinement pass (or subordinate pass) ====
This determine that if the coefficient is in the interval [Ti, 2Ti). And a refinement bit is coded for each significant coefficient.

In this method, it will visit the significant coefficients according to the magnitude and raster order within subbands.

==== (2) Significant pass (or dominant pass) ====
This method will code a bit for each coefficient that is not yet be seen as significant. Once a determination of significance has been made, the significant coefficient is included in a list for further refinement in the refinement pass. And if any coefficient already known to be zero, it will not be coded again.

== Example ==
DCT data                          ZeroTree scan order (EZW)
 63 -34  49  10   7  13 -12   7    A  B BE BF E1 E2 F1 F2
-31  23  14 -13   3   4   6  -1    C  D BG BH E3 E4 F3 F4
 15  14   3 -12   5  -7   3   9   CI CJ DM DN G1 G2 H1 H2
 -9  -7 -14   8   4  -2   3   2   CK CL DO DP G3 G4 H3 H4
 -5   9  -1  47   4   6  -2   2   I1 I2 J1 J2 M1 M2 N1 N2
  3   0  -3   2   3  -2   0   4   I3 I4 J3 J4 M3 M4 N3 N4
  2  -3   6  -4   3   6   3   6   K1 K2 L1 L2 O1 O2 P1 P2
  5  11   5   6   0   3  -4   4   K3 K4 L3 L4 O3 O4 P3 P4

D1: pnzt p    ttt  tztt tttttptt (20 codes)
    PNZT P(t) TTT  TZTT     TPTT   (D1 by M-EZW, 16 codes)
    PNZT P(t) Z(t) TZ(p)    TPZ(p) (D1 by NM-EZW, 11 codes)
      P N (t), P or N above zerotree scan
      P N Z(t p), p=pair T, t=triple T, P/N + TT/TTT in D1 code
S1: 1010
D2: ztnp tttttttt
S2: 1001 10 (Shapiro PDF end here)
D3: zzzz zppnppnttnnp tpttnttttttttptttptttttttttptttttttttttt
S3: 1001 11 01111011011000
D4: zzzzzzztztznzzzzpttptpptpnptntttttptpnpppptttttptptttpnp
S4: 1101 11 11011001000001 110110100010010101100
D5: zzzzztzzzzztpzzzttpttttnptppttptttnppnttttpnnpttpttppttt
S5: 1011 11 00110100010111 110101101100100000000 110110110011000111
D6: zzzttztttztttttnnttt
( http://www.polyvalens.com/wavelets/ezw/ )

Detailed: (new S is first, other computed by before cycles)
s-step      1                21               321
   val   D1 S1       R1   D2 S2       R2   D3 S3. ...   R3 ... D4,S4...
A   63   P  1  >=48  56   Z  .1 >=56  60   Z  ..1 >=60  62
B  -34   N  0   <48 -40   T  .0  <40 -36   Z  ..0  <36 -36
C  -31   IZ     <32   0   N  1. >=24 -28   Z  .1. >=28 -30
D   23   T      <32   0   P  0. <24   20   Z  .1. >=20  22

BE  49   P  1  >=48  56      .0  <56  52   Z  ..0  <52  50
BF  10   T      <32   0                    P  0    <12  10
BG  14   T      <32   0                    P  1   >=12  14
BH -13   T      <32   0                    N  1   >=12 -14
CI  15   T      <32   0   T      <16   0   P  1   >=12  14
CJ  14   IZ     <32   0   T      <16   0   P  1   >=12  14
CK  -9   T      <32   0   T      <16   0   N  0    <12 -10
CL  -7   T      <32   0   T      <16   0   T        <8   0
DM   3			  T      <16   0   T        <8   0
DN -12			  T      <16   0   N  1   >=12 -14
DO -14			  T      <16   0   N  1   >=12 -14
DP   8			  T      <16   0   P       <12  10

E1   7   T      <32   0                    .E,F,G,H(1,2,3,4)
E2  13   T      <32   0                    .I,J,K(1,2,3,4)
E3   3   T      <32   0                    .N,O,P(1,2,3,4)
E4   4   T      <32   0                    .
J1  -1   T      <32   0                    .
J2  47   P  0  >48   40       1 >=40  44   .
J3  -3   T      <32   0
J4   2   T      <32   0

D = dominant pass (P=positive, N=negative, T=ZeroTree, IZ=Izolated zero)
S = subordinate pass;
(R = back reconstructed value)

== See also ==
- Set partitioning in hierarchical trees (SPIHT)
