= Voluntary Organisations Disability Group =

The Voluntary Organisations Disability Group represents organisations within the voluntary sector who work alongside disabled people. It is a charity registered in London founded in 2008.

Rhidian Hughes is the chief executive.

It has repeatedly criticised the government's handling of the sleep-in carers issue and has had correspondence from Kelly Tolhurst, the minister, on behalf of non-profit employers in the social care sector.

It opposed the Mental Capacity (Amendment) Act 2019.

The organisation has repeatedly called for an end to austerity and lobbied government for sustainable reform of the social care system.

It supports the development of assistive technology in social care.

In December 2019 the group reported that 2,250 people with special needs were detained in long-stay NHS accommodation. 463 had been there for more than five years and 355 for more than 10 years. Effective provision of care in the community appeared a remote prospect for these patients.
