= Comparison of audio coding formats =

The following tables compare general and technical information for a variety of audio coding formats.

For listening tests comparing the perceived audio quality of audio formats and codecs, see the article Codec listening test.

== General information ==
Audio compression format	Creator	First public release date	Latest stable version	Cost		Proprietary implementations (codecs)	Open-source implementations (codecs)	Uses (other than consumer audio)	Music reproduction (consumer audio)	Telephony app	Lossless audio compression	Patented	DRM
Audio compression format	Creator	First public release date	Latest stable version	Encoder	Player	Proprietary implementations (codecs)	Open-source implementations (codecs)	Uses (other than consumer audio)	Music reproduction (consumer audio)	Telephony app	Lossless audio compression	Patented	DRM
AAC	ISO/IEC MPEG Audio Committee	1997	ISO/IEC 14496-3	Non-free		Nero Digital Audio, Apple CoreAudio (via QuickTime, iTunes or afconvert)	FAAC (encoding only), FAAD2 (decoding only), FFmpeg, Audiocogs (decoding only), Fraunhofer FDK AAC	Digital TV service, Digital Radio, Internet streaming	Yes	AAC-LD/AAC-ELD	MPEG-4 SLS	Yes	FairPlay (.m4p extension)
AC-3	Dolby Laboratories	1992	ATSC A52:2018	Free		DVD players, digital television, Camcorder	FFmpeg, liba52 (decoding only), Aften (encoding only), libavc (2.0 channels max)	Theatrical movie presentation, Digital TV service & home-video (personal recorders, DVD, etc.)	No	No	No	No	?
AC-4	Dolby Laboratories	2014	ATSC A342:2022-03	Non-free		Digital television, Harmonic Inc., DS Broadcast, Ateme, Synamedia, Dolby Media Encoder & Dolby Encoding Engine	ExoPlayer (decoding only for supported mobile devices), librempeg (decoding only)	Digital TV service	No	No	No	Yes	?
ALAC	Apple Inc.	2004-04-28	QuickTime 7.6	Free		QuickTime, iTunes, RealPlayer	MacOSforge, FFmpeg, Audiocogs (decoding only)	Music archival	Yes	No	Yes	Free	Possible, but never implemented
ALS	ISO/IEC MPEG Audio Committee	2005	ISO/IEC 14496-3	Free		MPEG-4 ALS	FFmpeg (decoding only)	-	Yes	No	Yes	Yes	?
AMBE	Digital Voice Systems	?	?	Non-free		?	mbelib	Low bandwidth HF/VHF digital radio, VoIP trunking	No	No	No	Yes	?
AMR	3GPP	1999-06-22	ETSI TS 126 071 V9.0.0 (2009)	Non-free		QuickTime, RealPlayer	FFmpeg (decoding only), FFmpeg with OpenCORE libraries, Android	voice recording	No	Yes	No	Yes	No
AMR-WB (G.722.2)	3GPP	2001-04-10	ETSI TS 126 190 V8.0.0 (2009-01)	Non-free		QuickTime, RealPlayer	FFmpeg (decoding only), FFmpeg with VisualOn libraries, Android (decoding only), opencore-amr for both encoding and decoding	voice recording	No	Yes	No	Yes	No
AMR-WB+	3GPP	2004-06-14	ETSI TS 126 290 V8.0.0 (2009-01)	Non-free		?	?	voice recording	Yes	Yes	No	Yes	No
aptX	Qualcomm	1989	2007	Non-free		Broadcast audio codecs: 2wcom systems, Systembase, APT, AVT, Harris Corporation, MAYAH, Prodys, Qbit; wireless headphones: iSkin, JayBird Gear, DTS discs for movies	FFmpeg	Low latency Studio/transmitter link, Bluetooth A2DP stereo, digital wireless microphone	Yes	No	No	Yes	No
ATRAC	Sony Corp.	1991	ATRAC3plus	Non-free		MiniDisc, Walkman, VAIO, Clie, PlayStation 3, PlayStation 4, PlayStation 5, PlayStation Portable, PlayStation Vita, SDDS, SonicStage, SoundForge, RealPlayer, ConnectPlayer	FFmpeg (decoding only, ATRAC Advanced Lossless is only partially supported)	voice recording, theatrical movie presentation	Yes	No	Yes	Yes	Yes
balrogg	Kamila Szewczyk (iczelia)	2026	1.4 (2026)	Free		?	?	Music archival	No	No	Yes	No	No
BroadVoice (BV16, BV32)	Broadcom	2009-08-19	1.2	Free		?	?	Speech, VoIP, Low latency, voice recording	No	Yes	No	Free	No
CELT	Xiph.Org Foundation, Jean-Marc Valin	2007-12-08	0.11.1 (merged into Opus)	Free		?	libcelt	Speech, VoIP, Low latency, Studio/transmitter link, wireless audio	Yes	Yes	No	No	No
Codec2	David Rowe	2010-08-25	1.2.0 (2023-07-14)	Free		?	c2enc, c2dec, FFmpeg with libcodec2 library	Low bandwidth HF/VHF digital radio, VoIP trunking	No	Yes	No	No	No
Eclipsa Audio	Samsung Electronics and Google (under AOMedia)	January 2025 (Commercial brand); October 2023 (IAMF standard)	2.0	Free	?	Eclipsa Audio	IAMF, libspatialaudio 0.4 for VideoLAN	Internet Streaming, Digital Television Services, Home-video etc.	Yes	No	Yes	No	?
Encodec	Facebook	2022-10-25	v0.1.1 (2022-10-26)	Free		?	Encodec	Speech, VoIP, voice recording	Yes	Yes	No	?	No
Enhanced AC-3 (E-AC-3)	Dolby Laboratories	2004	ATSC A52:2018	Free		Digital television	FFmpeg	Theatrical movie presentation, digital TV service & home-video (personal recorders, DVD, etc.)	No	No	No	Yes	Yes
EVS	Fraunhofer, JVC Kenwood, NTT, NTT Docomo, Panasonic, Ericsson	2014	?	Non-free	?	?	?	?	Yes	Yes	No	Yes	No
FLAC	Xiph.Org Foundation, Josh Coalson	2001-07-20	1.5.0 (2025-02-11)	Free			FLAC, Flake (encoding only), FFmpeg, FLACCL (encoding only), Audiocogs (decoding only)	Music archival	Yes	No	Yes	No	No
G.711	ITU-T	1972 (ITU-T standard from 1988)	G.711 Appendix II (02/00)	Free		Various proprietary VoIP software	FFmpeg, Ekiga, Asterisk (PBX) and almost any VoIP software	voice recording	No	Yes	No	No	No
G.722	ITU-T	1988-11		Free		Various proprietary VoIP software	Asterisk (PBX), QuteCom, FFmpeg	voice recording	No	Yes	No	No	No
G.722.1	ITU-T	1999-09	G.722.1 (05/05)	Free		Various proprietary VoIP software	FreeSWITCH, PJSIP, etc	voice recording	No	Yes	No	Yes	No
G.722.2 (AMR-WB)	ITU-T (adopted directly from 3GPP)	2002-01	G.722.2 (07/03)	Non-free		QuickTime, RealPlayer	FFmpeg (decoding only), FFmpeg with VisualOn libraries, Android (decoding only)	voice recording, audio	No	No	No	Yes	No
G.723.1	ITU-T	1996-03	G.723.1 (05/06)	Non-free		Various proprietary VoIP software	FFmpeg	voice recording	No	Yes	No	Yes	No
G.726	ITU-T	1990-12		Free		Various proprietary VoIP software	FFmpeg, Ekiga and other VoIP software	voice recording	No	Yes	No	No	No
G.728	ITU-T	1992-09		Non-free		Various proprietary VoIP software	FFmpeg (decoding only)	voice recording	No	Yes	No	Yes	No
G.729	ITU-T	1996-03	G.729 (06/12)	Free	Free	Various proprietary VoIP software	FFmpeg (decoding only)	voice recording	No	Yes	No	Expired	No
G.729.1	ITU-T	2006-05	G.729.1 Am.8 (03/13)	Free	Free	Various proprietary VoIP software		voice recording, DECT telephony	No	Yes	No	No	No
GSM-FR	ETSI Special Mobile Group	1990-1994 (ETS 300 580-2)	ETSI EN 300 961 V8.1.1 (2000–11)	Free			FFmpeg (decoding only), FFmpeg with external library libgsm, Ekiga and other VoIP software	voice recording	No	Yes	No	?	No
HE-AAC	ISO/IEC MPEG Audio Committee	2003	ISO/IEC 14496-3	?	?	?	Fraunhofer FDK AAC	?	Yes	No	No	?	?
iLBC	Global IP Solutions	2002	RFC 3951	Free		Cisco IP Communicator, old versions of Skype	Ekiga, Asterisk (PBX) and other VoIP software, FFmpeg with libilbc library	voice recording	No	Yes	No	Free	No
iSAC	Global IP Solutions	?		Free		Yahoo! Messenger	WebRTC	voice recording	No	Yes	No	Yes	?
LA	Michael Bevin	2002-09-07	0.4b (2004-02-08)	Free		Winamp with old plugin version, foobar2000 with old plugin version	?	Music archival	Yes	No	Yes	No	No
LC3	Bluetooth SIG	2022-04-11	1.03 (2023-05-09)	Free		?	liblc3, Android 13, BlueZ	Speech	Yes	Yes	No	?	No
LDAC	Sony Corp.	2015-04	?	Non-free		Sony Walkman, Sony Products, mobile phones	external_libldac, Android 8 (encoding only), pipewire (encoding and decoding)	Bluetooth audio	Yes	No	No	Yes	No
LHDC	Savitech	2017	5.0.6 (2022-08-03)	Non-free		Mobile phones, Bluetooth headphones, Home receivers	Android 10	Bluetooth audio	Yes	No	Yes	Yes	No
L2HC	Huawei	2020	3.0 (2023-09-19)	Non-free		Huawei products, EMUI, HarmonyOS	Android 10, OpenHarmony, Oniro OS	Bluetooth audio NearLink audio	Yes	Yes	Yes	Yes	Yes
Lyra	Google	2021-04-06	1.32 / V3 (2022-12-21)	Free		Google Duo	Lyra	Speech, VoIP, voice recording	Yes	Yes	No	?	No
Monkey's Audio	Matthew T. Ashland	2000	13.18 (2026-07-01)	Free			Monkey's Audio, FFmpeg (decoding only)	Music Archival	Yes	No	Yes	No	No
MP1 (MPEG-1/2 Audio Layer I)	ISO/IEC MPEG Audio Committee	1991-12-06	ISO/IEC 11172-3, ISO/IEC 13818-3	Free		?	FFmpeg (decoding only)	-	Yes	No	No	Expired	No
MP2 (MPEG-1/2 Audio Layer II)	ISO/IEC MPEG Audio Committee	1993	ISO/IEC 11172-3, ISO/IEC 13818-3	Free		various DVD software, video software, audio software	TooLAME (encoding only), TwoLAME (encoding only), FFmpeg	DAB, DVB, DVD, VCD, SVCD	Yes	No	No	Free	No
MP3 (MPEG-1/2/2.5 Audio Layer III)	ISO/IEC MPEG Audio Committee	1993	ISO/IEC 11172-3, ISO/IEC 13818-3	Free		FhG, l3enc, MP3enc, (old implementations: Xing TOMPG, SCMPX)	LAME (encoding only), FFmpeg (decoding only), libmad (decoding only), Audiocogs (decoding only), (old implementations: BladeEnc)	-	Yes	No	No	Expired	Yes (optional, rarely used)
MPEG-H 3D Audio	ISO/IEC MPEG Audio Committee	2013-01	ISO/IEC 23008-3	Non-free		FhG, MainConcept (encoding only)	libmpegh, mpeghdec (decoding only)	Digital TV service, voice recording	Yes	No	No	Yes	No
Musepack	Frank Klemm/MDT	1997	1.30 (2009-04-02)	Free			Musepack, FFmpeg (decoding only)	-	Yes	No	No	No	No
Nellymoser Asao	Nellymoser Inc.	2002	?	Non-free		Adobe Flash, Flash Player	FFmpeg	voice recording	No	No	No	Yes	?
OptimFROG	Florin Ghido	2001-12-16	5.100 (2016-09-02)	Free		OptimFROG and some media players (decoding only).	Some media players (decoding only)	Music archival	Yes	No	Yes	No	No
Opus	Xiph.Org Foundation, Internet Engineering Task Force	2012-09-11	RFC 6716 (libopus 1.6.1, 2026-01-14)	Free			libopus, FFmpeg	Speech, VoIP, Low latency, Studio/transmitter link, wireless audio, voice recording, WebRTC	Yes	Yes	No	Yes	No
OSQ	Steinberg	2002	?	Free		WaveLab	FFmpeg (decoding only)	Music archival	Yes	No	Yes	No	No
QOA	Dominic Szablewski	2023-02-02	1.0 (2023-04-24)	Free			qoa, FFmpeg (decoding only)	-	Yes	Yes	No	No	No
Sac	Sebastian Lehmann	2006-09-01	v0.7.26 (2026-06-10)	Free			Sac	Music archival	Yes	No	Yes	No	No
Satin	Microsoft	2020	?	Non-free		Microsoft Teams, Skype	?	Speech, VoIP, voice recording	Yes	Yes	No	Yes	No
SBC	Bluetooth SIG	2003	A2DP 1.3 (2012-07-24)	Free for Bluetooth		A2DP	BlueZ, FFmpeg	Bluetooth audio	Yes	No	No	Yes	No
Shorten	Tony Robinson	1993-03-30	3.6.1 (2007-03-19, final release)	Free		Shorten	FFmpeg (decoding only)	-	Yes	No	Yes	No (with commercial use restriction)	No
SILK	Skype Limited	2009-01-07	Merged into Opus	Free		Skype	SILK Speech Codec	voice recording	No	Yes	No	Yes	?
Siren 7	PictureTel Corp. (now Polycom Inc.)	1999		?		Microsoft Office Communicator	FreeSWITCH (libg722_1, aMSN (libsiren - part of libmsn), FFmpeg (decoding only)	voice recording	No	Yes	No	Yes	?
SNAC	Hubert Siuzdak	2024-02-20	1.2.1 (2024-09-11)	Free			SNAC	Speech, VoIP, voice recording	Yes	Yes	No	No	No
Speex	Xiph.Org Foundation, Jean-Marc Valin	2003-03-24	1.2.1 (obsoleted by Opus)	Free		Adobe Flash Player 10	Speex, FFmpeg with libspeex library	voice recording	No	Yes	No	No	No
SVOPC	Skype Limited	2007-03-28	2008-09-23 (Skype 3.8) (replaced by SILK)	Non-free		Skype		voice recording	No	Yes	No	Yes	No
Tom's lossless Audio Kompressor (TAK)	Thomas Becker	2007-01-26	2.3.3 (2022-06-30)	Free		Winamp with TAK plugin, foobar2000 with plugin, XMPlay	FFmpeg (decoding only)	Music archival	Yes	No	Yes	No	No
TSAC	Fabrice Bellard	2024-04-08	2024-04-08	Free		No	TSAC, Linux: , Windows (experimental): . Does encoding and decoding in one app, no separate encoder and decoder	Speech, VoIP, voice recording	Yes	Yes	No	No	No
True Audio (TTA)	TAU Software	1999	2.3 (2015-02-24)	Free			TTA, FFmpeg	-	Yes	No	Yes	No	No
TwinVQ	Nippon Telegraph and Telephone	1996 (?)		Non-free		Winamp with VQF plugin, NTT TwinVQ player/encoder, Yamaha SoundVQ player, Nero Media Player	FFmpeg (decoding only)	speech	Yes	No	No	Yes	?
USAC	Fraunhofer IIS	2012	4.4.0 (2023-06-21)	Non-free	?	EZ CD Audio Converter, FFmpeg with Mainconcept plugin (encoder only), Sonnox, Apple (decoder only), QuickTime (Mac version & decoder only).	Exhale (encoder only), FFmpeg (decoding only with Fraunhofer FDK AAC library enabled for manually command, native decoding only), Android (decoder only)	-	Yes	No	No	No	No
Vorbis (Ogg)	Xiph.Org Foundation	2000-05-11	1.3.7 (2020-07-04)	Free			libvorbis, aoTuV, FFmpeg	-	Yes	No	No	No	No
WAV	IBM, Microsoft	1991-08	2007-03-07	Free			All	Music archival	Yes	No	Yes	No	No
WavPack	Conifer Software	1998	5.9.0 (2026-01-16)	Free			WavPack, FFmpeg	Music archival	Yes	No	Yes	No	No
Windows Media Audio	Microsoft	1999	11.0	Free for consumer licensees of the Windows operating system	Free for licensees of the Windows operating system	Windows Media Player, Windows Media Encoder	FFmpeg (decoding only for Pro, Lossless and Voice)	internet streaming	Yes	No	Yes	Yes	Optional
Audio compression format	Creator	First public release date	Latest stable version	Encoder	Player	Proprietary implementations (codecs)	Open-source implementations (codecs)	Uses (other than consumer audio)	Music reproduction (consumer audio)	Telephony app	Lossless audio compression	Patented	DRM
Audio compression format	Creator	First public release date	Latest stable version	cost		Proprietary implementations (codecs)	Open-source implementations (codecs)	Uses (other than consumer audio)	Music reproduction (consumer audio)	Telephony app	Lossless audio compression	Patented	DRM

=== Notes ===
1. The 'Music' category is merely a guideline on commercialized uses of a particular format, not a technical assessment of its capabilities. For example, MP3 and AAC dominate the personal audio market in terms of market share, though many other formats are comparably well suited to fill this role from a purely technical standpoint.
2. First public release date is first of either specification publishing or source releasing, or in the case of closed-specification, closed-source codecs, is the date of first binary releasing. Many developing codecs have pre-releases consisting of pre-1.0 versions and perhaps 1.0 release candidates (RCs), although 1.0 may not necessarily be the release version.
3. Latest stable version is that of specification or reference tools.
4. If there happens to be OSI licensed software available for a particular format, this does not necessarily permit one to use said codec free of charge. Likewise, if there is only proprietary licensed software available for a particular format, one might be able to use the codec free of charge.

== Operating system support ==
Codec	Windows	macOS	Linux	BSD	Unix	Palm OS	Symbian OS	Rockbox	iOS	Android	Chromium	HarmonyOS	OpenHarmony	Oniro OS
AAC	Yes	Yes	Yes	Yes	Yes	Yes	Yes	Yes	Yes	Yes	Yes	Yes	Yes	Yes
AC-3	Yes	Yes	Yes	Yes	Yes	?	Yes	Yes	Yes	Yes	?	Yes	Yes	Yes
ALAC	Yes	Yes	Yes	Yes	Yes	No	No	Yes	Yes	Yes	No	Yes	No	No
ALS	?	?	?	?	?	?	?	?	?	?	?	?	?	?
aptX	Yes	Yes	Yes	Yes	Yes	No	No	No	No	Yes	No	No	?	?
CELT	Yes	Yes	Yes	Yes	Yes	Yes	No	Yes	No	No	No	No	No	No
E-AC3	Yes	Yes	Yes	Yes	Yes	?	Yes	No	Yes	Yes	?	Yes	Yes	Yes
Eclipsa	Yes	Yes	Yes	Yes	Yes	?	?	?	Yes	Yes	Yes	Yes	Yes	?
FLAC	Yes	Yes	Yes	Yes	Yes	Yes	Yes	Yes	Yes	Yes	Yes	Yes	Yes	Yes
LC3	Yes	No	Yes	Yes	Yes	No	No	No	No	Yes	No	Yes	Yes	Yes
L2HC	Yes	No	Yes	No	No	No	No	No	No	Yes	No	Yes	Yes	Yes
Monkey's Audio	Yes	Yes	Yes	Yes	Yes	No	No	Yes	No	No	No	No	No	No
MP3	Yes	Yes	Yes	Yes	Yes	Yes	Yes	Yes	Yes	Yes	Yes	Yes	Yes	Yes
Musepack	Yes	Yes	Yes	Yes	Yes	Yes	Yes	Yes	No	No	No	No	No	No
Opus	Yes	Yes	Yes	Yes	Yes	No	No	Yes	Yes	Yes	Yes	Yes	Yes	Yes
RealAudio	Yes	Yes	Yes	Yes	Yes	Yes	Yes	Yes	No	No	No	No	No	No
Speex	Yes	Yes	Yes	Yes	Yes	Yes	Yes	Yes	No	No	No	No	No	No
True Audio (TTA)	Yes	Yes	Yes	Yes	Yes	Yes	Yes	Yes	No	Yes	Yes	Yes	Yes	Yes
USAC	Yes	Yes	Yes	No	No	No	No	No	Yes	Yes	No	?	?	?
Vorbis	Yes	Yes	Yes	Yes	Yes	Yes	Yes	Yes	No	Yes	Yes	Yes	Yes	Yes
WavPack	Yes	Yes	Yes	Yes	Yes	Yes	Yes	Yes	No	No	No	Yes	Yes	Yes
WMA	Yes	Yes	Yes	Yes	Yes	Yes	Yes	Yes	No	Yes	No	Yes	?	?

== Multimedia frameworks support ==
Audio compression format	ACM	DirectShow	QuickTime	GStreamer	FFmpeg	Media Foundation
8SVX	Yes (ffdshow)	Yes (ffdshow)	Yes (Perian)	Yes (GStreamer FFmpeg plug-in)	Yes	Yes (ffdshow)
AAC	Yes	Yes (ffdshow, Monogram)	Yes	Yes (GStreamer FFmpeg plug-in)	Yes	Yes
AC3	Yes	Yes (ffdshow)	Yes (Perian)	Yes (GStreamer FFmpeg plug-in)	Yes	Yes
AC4	No	No	No	Yes (GStreamer external plugins with Dolby proprietary libraries)	No	No
ALS	?	?	?	?	?	?
AMR	No	No	Yes	Yes (GStreamer Ugly Plug-ins)	Yes	Yes
ALAC	Yes	Yes (ffdshow)	Yes	Yes (GStreamer FFmpeg plug-in)	Yes	Yes
aptX	?	?	?	?	Yes	?
ATRAC3	Yes (ffdshow)	Yes (ffdshow)	Yes (Perian)	Yes (GStreamer FFmpeg plug-in)	Yes	Yes (ffdshow)
ATRAC3plus	No	No	No	No	Yes	Yes (ffdshow)
CELT	?	?	?	?	?	?
Cook Codec	Yes (ffdshow)	Yes (ffdshow)	Yes (Perian)	Yes (GStreamer FFmpeg plug-in)	Yes	Yes (ffdshow)
DCA aka DTS	Yes (ffdshow)	Yes (ffdshow)	Yes (Perian)	Yes (GStreamer FFmpeg plug-in)	Yes	Yes (ffdshow)
DTS-HD	Yes (ffdshow)	Yes (ffdshow)	Yes (Perian)	Yes (GStreamer FFmpeg plug-in)	Yes	Yes (ffdshow)
E-AC-3	Yes	Yes (ffdshow)	Yes (Perian)	Yes (GStreamer FFmpeg plug-in)	Yes	Yes
Eclipsa Audio	Yes	Yes (ffdshow)	Yes (Perian)	Yes (GStreamer FFmpeg plug-in)	Yes	Yes
FLAC	yes	Yes (ffdshow)	Yes (Perian)	Yes (GStreamer Base Plug-ins, GStreamer FFmpeg plug-in)	Yes	Yes
L2HC	?	?	?	?	?	?
HE-AAC	?	?	?	?	?	?
Monkey's Audio	Yes (ffdshow)	Yes (ffdshow)	Yes (Perian)	Yes (GStreamer FFmpeg plug-in)	Yes	Yes (ffdshow)
WavPack	Yes (ffdshow)	Yes (ffdshow)	Yes (Perian)	Yes (GStreamer FFmpeg plug-in)	Yes	Yes (ffdshow)
Shorten	Yes (ffdshow)	Yes (ffdshow)	Yes (Perian)	Yes (GStreamer FFmpeg plug-in)	Yes	Yes (ffdshow)
Sonic Audio	Yes (ffdshow)	Yes (ffdshow)	Yes (Perian)	Yes (GStreamer FFmpeg plug-in)	Yes	Yes (ffdshow)
MP3	Yes	Yes	Yes	Yes (GStreamer Ugly, GStreamer FFmpeg plug-in)	Yes	Yes
RealAudio	Yes (ffdshow)	Yes (ffdshow)	Yes (Perian)	Yes (GStreamer FFmpeg plug-in, GStreamer DLL loader plugin + Binary Codec Packages)	Yes	Yes (ffdshow)
Speex	Yes (ffdshow)	Yes (ffdshow)	Yes (Perian)	Yes (GStramer Good Plug-ins, GStreamer FFmpeg plug-in)	Yes	Yes (ffdshow)
Vorbis	Yes (ffdshow)	Yes (ffdshow)	Yes (Perian)	Yes (GStreamer Base Plug-ins, GStreamer FFmpeg plug-in)	Yes	Yes (ffdshow)
La ???	No	No	No	No	No	Yes (ffdshow)
LPAC	No	No	No	No	No	Yes (ffdshow)
Windows Media Audio v1	Yes	Yes	Yes (Perian)	Yes (GStreamer FFmpeg plug-in)	Yes	Yes
Windows Media Audio v2	Yes	Yes	Yes (Perian)	Yes (GStreamer FFmpeg plug-in)	Yes	Yes
Windows Media Audio Pro	Yes	Yes	Yes (Perian)	Yes (GStreamer FFmpeg plug-in)	Yes	Yes
Windows Media Audio Lossless	Yes	Yes	Yes (flip4mac)	Yes (GStreamer FFmpeg plug-in)	Yes	Yes
Windows Media Audio Voice	Yes	Yes	No	No	Yes	Yes
Musepack	Yes (ffdshow)	Yes (ffdshow, Monogram)	Yes (Perian)	Yes (GStreamer FFmpeg plug-in)	Yes	Yes (ffdshow)
Meridian Lossless Packing	Yes (ffdshow)	Yes (ffdshow)	Yes (Perian)	Yes (GStreamer FFmpeg plug-in)	Yes	Yes (ffdshow)
Nellymoser Asao Codec in Flash	Yes (ffdshow)	Yes (ffdshow)	Yes (Perian)	Yes (GStreamer FFmpeg plug-in)	Yes	Yes (ffdshow)
OptimFROG	No	No	No	No	No	Yes (ffdshow)
Truespeech	Yes	Yes	Yes (Perian)	Yes (GStreamer FFmpeg plug-in)	Yes	Yes (ffdshow)
True Audio (TTA)	Yes (ffdshow)	Yes (ffdshow)	Yes (Perian)	Yes (GStreamer FFmpeg plug-in)	Yes	Yes (ffdshow)
QCELP	Yes (ffdshow)	Yes (ffdshow)	Yes	Yes (GStreamer FFmpeg plug-in)	Yes	Yes (ffdshow)
Audio compression format	ACM	DirectShow	QuickTime	GStreamer	FFmpeg	Media Foundation

== Technical details ==
Lossy formats
Audio compression format	Algorithm	Sample rate	Bit rate	Latency	CBR	VBR	Stereo	Multichannel
AAC	MDCT, Hybrid Subband (AAC-HE)	8–192 kHz, also: 7.35 kHz, but used rarely.	8–529 kbit/s (stereo, 44.1 kHz) 8–576 kbit/s (stereo, 48 kHz)	20–405 ms	Yes	Yes	Yes: Dual, Mid/Side, Intensity, Parametric	Yes: Up to 48 channels
AC3	MDCT	32, 44.1, 48 kHz	32–640 kbit/s	32–48 ms	Yes	Theoretically; no good encoders exist which support VBR	Yes	Yes: Up to 6 channels
AC4	MDCT	48 kHz	24–1536 kbit/s	?	Yes	No	Yes	Yes: Up to 24 channels
AMBE	?	8 kHz	2-9.6 kbit/s	?	?	?	?	?
AMR	ACELP	8 kHz	4.75, 5.15, 5.90, 6.70, 7.40, 7.95, 10.20, 12.20 kbit/s	25 ms	Yes	Yes	No	No
AMR-WB (G.722.2)	ACELP	16 kHz	6.60, 8.85, 12.65, 14.25, 15.85, 18.25, 19.85, 23.05, 23.85 kbit/s	25 ms	Yes	Yes	Yes: only in MPEG-4 Part 12 container	No
AMR-WB+	ACELP	8, 11.025, 16, 22.05, 32, 44.1, 48 kHz	6–36 kbit/s (mono); 7–48 kbit/s (stereo)	60–90 ms	Yes	Yes	Yes	No
aptX	Subband ADPCM	24–48 kHz (stereo)	192–384 kbit/s (stereo)	2 ms	Yes (4:1)	No	Yes	Yes: Up to 8 channels
ATRAC1	MDCT-Hybrid Subband	44.1 kHz	292 kbit/s	>100 ms	Yes	No	Yes: Dual Only	No
ATRAC3	MDCT-Hybrid Subband	44.1 kHz	66, 105, 132, 146, 176, 264, 352 kbit/s	>100 ms	Yes	No	Yes: Dual (LP2), Mid/Side (LP4)	No
ATRAC3plus	MDCT-Hybrid Subband	44.1, 48 kHz	32–768 kbit/s	>100 ms	Yes	No	Yes	Yes: Up to 8 channels
ATRAC9	MDCT-Hybrid Subband	12, 24, 48 kHz	36–672 kbit/s	>100 ms	Yes	No	Yes	Yes: Up to 8 channels
BroadVoice (BV16, BV32)	Two-Stage Noise Feedback Coding (TSNFC)	8, 16 kHz	16, 32 kbit/s	5 ms	Yes	No	No	No
Codec2	Speech	8 kHz	0.7, 1.2, 1.3, 1.4, 1.6, 2.4, 3.2 kbit/s	20–40 ms	Yes	No	No	No
E-AC3	MDCT	32, 44.1, 48 kHz	32–6144 kbit/s	5.33–48 ms	Yes	No	Yes	Yes: Up to 15 channels
Eclipsa Audio (With lossy codecs)	Hybrid	16 kHz to 96 kHz (Opus decoded at exactly 48 kHz for sync)	Adaptive and Varies based on Codec	Varies	Yes	Yes	Yes	Object-based, Uncapped virtual objects
E-aptX	Subband ADPCM	15–48 kHz	60, 384, 767, 1024 kbit/s, 1.28 Mbit/s	?	Yes (4:1)	No	Yes	Yes: Up to 8 channels
Encodec	Neural networks	24 kHz (Mono) 48 kHz (Stereo)	1.5 (Mono only), 3, 6, 12, 24 kbit/s	?	Yes	No	Yes	No
EVS	Speech	8, 16, 32, 48 kHz	5.9, 7.2, 8, 9.6, 13.2, 16.4, 24.4, 32, 48, 64, 96, 128 kbit/s + AMR-WB bitrate modes	20 ms	Yes	Only 5.9 kbit/s with DTX on	Yes	No
GSM-HR	VSELP	8 kHz	5.6 kbit/s	25 ms	Yes	No	No	No
GSM-FR	RPE-LTP	8 kHz	13 kbit/s	20–30 ms	Yes	No	No	No
GSM-EFR	ACELP	8 kHz	12.2 kbit/s	20–30 ms	Yes	No	No	No
HE-AAC	?	22 ~ 96 kHz (also 16 kHz, but used somewhat rarely)	16 ~ 80 kbit/s (other bitrates, but used somewhat rarely: 3 ~ 264 kbit/s)	~130 ms	Yes	Yes	Yes: Dual, Mid/Side, Intensity, Parametric	Yes: Up to 48 channels
HVXC	Speech	8 kHz	2, 4 kbit/s	36 ms	Yes	Yes	No	No
iLBC	Block Independent LPC	8 kHz	13.33, 15.20 kbit/s	25, 40 ms	Yes	No	No	No
iSAC	Transform coding	16, 32 kHz	10–52 kbit/s	33, 63 ms	Yes	Yes	No	No
LC3	Speech	8, 16, 24, 32, 48 kHz	16–320 kbit/s	7.5–10 ms	Yes	No	Yes	No
LDAC	Subband ADPCM	44.1, 48, 88.2, 96, 176.4, 192 kHz	303, 606, 909 kbit/s (44.1/88.2/176.4 kHz) 330, 660, 990 kbit/s (48/96/192 kHz)	?	Yes	No	Yes	No
LHDC	Subband ADPCM	44.1, 48, 96 kHz	400, 560, 900 kbit/s	?	Yes	No	Yes	No
L2HC	Subband ADPCM	44.1, 48, 96, 192 kHz	400, 560, 960, 1920 kbit/s	?	Yes	No	Yes	?
Lyra	Speech	8, 16, 32, 48 kHz	3.2, 6, 9.2 kbit/s	20 ms	Yes	No	No	No
MP3 (MPEG-1, 2, 2.5 Audio Layer III)	MDCT, Hybrid Subband	8, 11.025, 12, 16, 22.05, 24, 32, 44.1, 48 kHz	8, 16, 24, 32, 40, 48, 56, 64, 80, 96, 112, 128, 144, 160, 192, 224, 256, 288, 320 kbit/s	>100 ms	Yes	Yes	Yes: Dual, Mid/Side, Intensity	No
MPEG-1 Audio Layer II (MP2)	Subband	32, 44.1, 48 kHz	32, 48, 56, 64, 80, 96, 112, 128, 160, 192, 224, 256, 320, 384 kbit/s		Yes	Yes: but decoders are not required to support it	Yes: Dual, Intensity	No
MPEG-2 Audio Layer II (MP2)	Subband	16, 22.05, 24 kHz	8, 16, 24, 32, 40, 48, 56, 64, 80, 96, 112, 128, 144, 160 kbit/s		Yes	Yes: but decoders are not required to support it	Yes	Yes: up to 5 full range audio channels and an LFE-channel with MPEG Multichannel
Musepack	Subband	32, 37.8, 44.1, 48 kHz	20–350 kbit/s	?	No	Yes	Yes	Yes: Up to 8 channels
Opus	MDCT, LPC, LTP	8–48 kHz	6–510 kbit/s	5–66.5 ms	Yes	Yes	Yes	Yes: Up to 255 channels
RealAudio	MDCT	Varies (see article)	Varies (see article)	Varies	Yes	Yes	Yes	Yes: Up to 6 channels
Satin	Speech	8, 16, 32, 48 kHz	6–36 kbit/s	?	Yes	No	Yes	No
SILK	LPC, LTP	8, 12, 16, 24 kHz	6–40 kbit/s	25 ms	Yes	?	?	?
Siren 7	Derived from PT716plus, MLT	16 kHz	16, 24, 32 kbit/s	40 ms	Yes	No	No	No
Siren 14	MLT	32 kHz	24, 32, 48 kbit/s (mono); 48, 64, 96 kbit/s (stereo)	40 ms	Yes	No	Yes	No
Siren 22	MLT	48 kHz	32, 48, 64 kbit/s (mono); 64, 96, 128 kbit/s (stereo)	40 ms	Yes	No	Yes	No
SNAC	Neural networks	24, 32, 44.1 kHz	0.98 (24 kHz), 1.9 (32 kHz), 2.6 (44.1 kHz) kbit/s	?	Yes	No	No	No
Speex	CELP	8, 16, 32, (48) kHz	2.15–24.6 kbit/s (NB); 4–44.2 kbit/s (WB)	30 ms (NB); 34 ms (WB)	Yes	Yes	Yes: Intensity	Yes
TSAC	Neural networks, modified version of Descript Audio Codec, extended for stereo with a transformer model to shrink even more while keeping the quality high.	44.1 kHz (Mono and Stereo). Other sample rates: Uncertain.	~0.45–5.5 kbps (mono) ~0.6–7.5 kbps (stereo)	?	Yes	No	Yes	No
USAC	?	7.35, 8, 11.025, 12, 16, 19.2, 22.05, 24, 32, 38.4, 44.1, 48, 57.6, 64, 88.2, 96 kHz	6–128 kbit/s (mono) 12–320 kbit/s (stereo)	?	Yes	Yes	Yes	No
VMR-WB	ACELP	16 kHz	8.55, 4.0, 0.8, 13.3, 6.2, 2.7, 1.0 kbit/s	33.75 ms	Yes	Yes	?	?
Vorbis (Ogg)	MDCT	8–192 kHz	45–500 kbit/s (32–500 kbit/s for aoTuV tunings)	>100 ms	Yes/ABR	Yes	Yes: Dual, Lossless, Phase, Point (Intensity)	Yes: Up to 255 channels
WavPack Lossy	Prediction, Quantization	1 Hz to 16.777216 MHz	196 kbit/s and up in lossy mode (for CD audio)	3523.8 ms	Yes	Yes	Yes	Yes: Up to 256 channels
Windows Media Audio Standard	MDCT	8, 11.025, 16, 22.05, 32, 44.1, 48 kHz	8–768 kbit/s	>100 ms	Yes	Yes	Yes	Unofficial, requires modification
Windows Media Audio Pro	MDCT	8, 11.025, 16, 22.05, 32, 44.1, 48, 88.2, 96 kHz (8-22.05kHz not supported by all encoders)	4–768 kbit/s	>100 ms	Yes	Yes	Yes	Yes: At least 8 channels, expandable
Windows Media Audio Voice	ACELP?	8, 11.025, 16, 22.05 kHz officially (can be hacked to support higher sample rates)	4-20 kbit/s officially (can be hacked to support higher bitrates)	?	Yes	No	Unofficial, requires modification	Unofficial, requires modification

Lossless formats
Audio compression format	Algorithm	Sample rate	Bits per sample	Latency	Stereo	Multichannel
ALAC	Lossless	1–384 kHz	16, 20, 24, 32	?	Yes	Yes: Up to 8 channels
ALS	Lossless	0–4 GHz	8, 16, 24, 32 (int or float)	?	Yes	Yes: Up to 65536 channels
ATRAC Advanced Lossless	Lossless	44.1 kHz	16	?	Yes	No
Dolby TrueHD	Lossless	48, 96, 192 kHz	16, 20, 24	?	Yes	Yes: 5.1, 7.1, and Dolby Atmos object-based audio
DTS-HD Master Audio	Lossless	48, 96, 192 kHz	16, 24	?	Yes	Yes: Up to 7.1
Eclipsa Audio (with Lossless codecs)	Hybrid,Lossless	Varies	16, 24, 32 (float)	?	Yes	Object-based, Uncapped virtual objects
FLAC	Lossless	1–1.048575 MHz (>655.350 kHz need not be streamable)	4–32	4.3–92 ms (46.4 ms typical)	Yes	Yes: Up to 8 channels
HD-AAC	?	?	?	?	?	?
LA	Lossless	0–4 GHz	16	?	Yes	No
L2HC	Lossless	44.1kHz	16	?	Yes	No
Monkey's Audio	Lossless	1–655.350 kHz	8, 16, 24, 32 and 32-bit float	1670 to 26,749 ms (varies with compression)	Yes	Yes: Up to 32 channels since version 5.50
OptimFROG	Lossless	0–4 GHz	8, 16, 24, 32 (int or float)	?	Yes	No
OSQ	Lossless	6, 8, 11.025, 16, 22.05, 32, 44.1, 48, 64, 88.2, 96 kHz	8, 16, 20, 24	?	Yes	No
RealAudio Lossless	Lossless	8, 11.025, 16, 22.05, 32, 44.1 kHz	16	Varies	Yes	No
Sac	Lossless	1–48 kHz	1–16	?	Yes	No
TAK	Lossless	8–192 kHz	8, 16, 24	?	Yes	Yes: Up to 6 channels
True Audio (TTA)	Lossless	0–4 GHz	8, 16, 24	approx. 1045 ms	Yes	Yes: Up to 16 (with ffmpeg), but no channel allocation
WavPack Lossless	Lossless, Hybrid	1 Hz to 1 GHz	Up to 32 (and 32-bit float), and 1-bit DSD.	?	Yes	Yes: Up to 256 channels
Windows Media Audio Lossless	Lossless	8, 11.025, 16, 22.05, 32, 44.1, 48, 88.2, 96 kHz	16, 24	>100 ms	Yes	Yes: Up to 6 channels

ITU-T formats
Audio compression format	Algorithm	Sample rate	Bit rate	Bits per sample	Latency	CBR	VBR	Stereo	Multichannel
G.711	companding A-law or μ-law, PCM	8 kHz	64 kbit/s	8 bit (log)	125 μs (typical)	Yes	No	No	No
G.711.0	Lossless compression of G.711	8 kHz	0.2–65.6 kbit/s	8 bit (log)	5–40 ms	No	Yes	No	No
G.711.1	MDCT, A-law, μ-law	8, 16 kHz	64, 80, 96 kbit/s	16 bit	11.875 ms	Yes	Yes	No	No
G.718	CELP, MDCT, Lossy	8, 16 kHz	8, 12, 12.65, 16, 24, 32 kbit/s	16 bit	42.875–43.875 ms	Yes	Yes	No	No
G.718B	CELP, MDCT, Lossy, Sinusoidal Coding	32 kHz	36, 40, 48 kbit/s	16 bit	49.625 ms	Yes	Yes	No	No
G.719	MDCT, Lossy (incorporates elements of Siren Codec and Ericsson technology)	48 kHz	32–88 kbit/s in 4 kbit/s steps, 88–128 kbit/s in 8 kbit/s steps	16 bit	40 ms	Yes	No	Yes: only in MPEG-4 Part 12 container	Yes: only in MPEG-4 Part 12 container
G.721	ADPCM, Lossy	8 kHz	32 kbit/s	13 bit		Yes	No	No	No
G.722	sub-band ADPCM, Lossy	16 kHz	64 kbit/s (comprises 48, 56 or 64 kbit/s audio and 16, 8 or 0 kbit/s auxiliary data)	14 bit	4 ms	Yes	No	No	No
G.722.1	Modulated Lapped Transform (MDCT), Lossy (based on Siren Codec)	16 kHz	24, 32 kbit/s	16 bit	40 ms	Yes	No	No	No
G.722.1C	Modulated Lapped Transform (MDCT), Lossy (based on Siren Codec)	32 kHz	24, 32, 48 kbit/s	16 bit	40 ms	Yes	No	No	No
G.722.2 (AMR-WB)	multi-rate wideband ACELP, Lossy	16 kHz	6.60, 8.85, 12.65, 14.25, 15.85, 18.25, 19.85, 23.05, 23.85 kbit/s	14 bit	25 ms	Yes	Yes	Yes: only in MPEG-4 Part 12 container	No
G.723	ADPCM, Lossy	8 kHz	24, 40 kbit/s	13 bit		Yes	No	No	No
G.723.1	MP-MLQ, ACELP, Lossy	8 kHz	5.3, 6.3 kbit/s	13 bit	37.5 ms	Yes	No	No	No
G.726	ADPCM, Lossy	8 kHz	16, 24, 32, 40 kbit/s	13 bit	125 μs	Yes	No	No	No
G.727	ADPCM, Lossy	8 kHz	16, 24, 32, 40 kbit/s	13 bit		Yes	Yes	No	No
G.728	low-delay CELP, Lossy	8 kHz	16 kbit/s	13 bit	0.625 ms	Yes	No	No	No
G.729	CS-ACELP, Lossy	8 kHz	8 kbit/s	13 bit	15 ms	Yes	No	No	No
G.729D	CS-ACELP, Lossy	8 kHz	6.4 kbit/s	13 bit		Yes	No	No	No
G.729E	CS-ACELP, Lossy	8 kHz	11.8 kbit/s	13 bit	15 ms	Yes	No	No	No
G.729.1	CELP, TDBWE, TDAC (MDCT), Lossy	8, 16 kHz	8 kbit/s, 12–32 kbit/s in 2 kbit/s steps	16 bit	48.9375 ms	Yes	Yes	No	No

=== Notes ===
- The latency listed here is the total delay (frame size, plus all lookahead) at the normal operating sample rate (typically 44.1 kHz).
- Lossless compression will have a variable bit rate.

== See also ==
- Comparison of audio player software
- Comparison of video player software
- List of codecs
  - List of open-source codecs
- Comparison of video codecs
- Comparison of video container formats
