= RTP payload formats =

Multimedia information signaling

The Real-time Transport Protocol (RTP) specifies a general-purpose data format and network protocol for transmitting digital media streams on Internet Protocol (IP) networks. The details of media encoding, such as signal sampling rate, frame size and timing, are specified in an RTP payload format. The format parameters of the RTP payload are typically communicated between transmission endpoints with the Session Description Protocol (SDP), but other protocols, such as the Extensible Messaging and Presence Protocol (XMPP) may be used.

== Payload types and formats ==
The technical parameters of payload formats for audio and video streams are standardised. The standard also describes the process of registering new payload types with IANA.

- RFC 3550 – "RTP: A Transport Protocol for Real-Time Applications," Internet Standard 64.
- RFC 3551 – "RTP Profile for Audio and Video Conferences with Minimal Control," Internet Standard 65.
- RFC 3611 – "RTP Control Protocol Extended Reports (RTCP XR)," Proposed Standard.
- RFC 4856 – "Media Type Registration of Payload Formats in the RTP Profile for Audio and Video Conferences," Proposed Standard.

== Text messaging payload types ==
Payload formats and types for text messaging are defined in the following specifications:

- RFC 4103 – "RTP Payload for Text Conversation," Proposed Standard. Obsoletes RFC 2793. Updated by RFC 9071.
- RFC 9071 – "RTP-Mixer Formatting of Multiparty Real-Time Text," Proposed Standard.

== MIDI payload types ==
Payload formats and types for MIDI are defined in the following specifications:

- RFC 6295 – "RTP Payload Format for MIDI," Proposed Standard.
- RFC 4696 – "An Implementation Guide for RTP MIDI," Informational.

== Audio and video payload types ==
Payload formats and types for audio and video are defined in the following specifications:

- RFC 2029 – "RTP Payload Format of Sun's CellB Video Encoding," Proposed Standard.
- RFC 2190 – "RTP Payload Format for H.263 Video Streams," Historic.
- RFC 2198 – "RTP Payload for Redundant Audio Data," Proposed Standard.
- RFC 2250 – "RTP Payload Format for MPEG1/MPEG2 Video," Proposed Standard.
- RFC 2343 – "RTP Payload Format for Bundled MPEG," Experimental.
- RFC 2435 – "RTP Payload Format for JPEG-compressed Video," Proposed Standard.
- RFC 2586 – "The Audio/L16 MIME content type," Informational.
- RFC 2658 – "RTP Payload Format for PureVoice(tm) Audio," Proposed Standard.
- RFC 3190 – "RTP Payload Format for 12-bit DAT Audio and 20- and 24-bit Linear Sampled Audio," Proposed Standard.
- RFC 3389 – "Real-time Transport Protocol (RTP) Payload for Comfort Noise (CN)," Proposed Standard.
- RFC 3497 – "RTP Payload Format for Society of Motion Picture and Television Engineers (SMPTE) 292M Video," Informational.
- RFC 3640 – "RTP Payload Format for Transport of MPEG-4 Elementary Streams," Proposed Standard.
- RFC 3952 – "Real-time Transport Protocol (RTP) Payload Format for internet Low Bit Rate Codec (iLBC) Speech," Experimental.
- RFC 4175 – "RTP Payload Format for Uncompressed Video," Proposed Standard.
- RFC 4184 – "RTP Payload Format for AC-3 Audio," Proposed Standard.
- RFC 4352 – "RTP Payload Format for the Extended Adaptive Multi-Rate Wideband (AMR-WB+) Audio Codec," Proposed Standard.
- RFC 4587 – "RTP Payload Format for H.261 Video Streams," Proposed Standard.
- RFC 4598 – "Real-time Transport Protocol (RTP) Payload Format for Enhanced AC-3 (E-AC-3) Audio," Proposed Standard.
- RFC 4629 – "RTP Payload Format for ITU-T Rec. H.263 Video," Proposed Standard.
- RFC 4733 – "RTP Payload for DTMF Digits, Telephony Tones, and Telephony Signals," Proposed Standard.
- RFC 4749 – "RTP Payload Format for the G.729.1 Audio Codec," Proposed Standard.
- RFC 4788 – "Enhancements to RTP Payload Formats for EVRC Family Codecs," Proposed Standard.
- RFC 4867 – "RTP Payload Format and File Storage Format for the Adaptive Multi-Rate (AMR) and Adaptive Multi-Rate Wideband (AMR-WB) Audio Codecs," Proposed Standard.
- RFC 5188 – "RTP Payload Format for the Enhanced Variable Rate Wideband Codec (EVRC-WB) and the Media Subtype Updates for EVRC-B Codec," Proposed Standard.
- RFC 5215 – "RTP Payload Format for Vorbis Encoded Audio," Proposed Standard.
- RFC 5371 – "RTP Payload Format for JPEG 2000 Video Streams," Proposed Standard.
- RFC 5391 – "RTP Payload Format for ITU-T Recommendation G.711.1," Proposed Standard.
- RFC 5404 – "RTP Payload Format for G.719," Proposed Standard.
- RFC 5574 – "RTP Payload Format for the Speex Codec," Proposed Standard.
- RFC 5577 – "RTP Payload Format for ITU-T Recommendation G.722.1," Proposed Standard.
- RFC 5584 – "RTP Payload Format for the Adaptive TRansform Acoustic Coding (ATRAC) Family," Proposed Standard.
- RFC 5686 – "RTP Payload Format for mU-law EMbedded Codec for Low-delay IP Communication (UEMCLIP) Speech Codec," Proposed Standard.
- RFC 5993 – "RTP Payload Format for Global System for Mobile Communications Half Rate (GSM-HR)," Proposed Standard.
- RFC 6184 – "RTP Payload Format for H.264 Video," Proposed Standard.
- RFC 6190 – "RTP Payload Format for Scalable Video Coding," Proposed Standard.
- RFC 6416 – "RTP Payload Format for MPEG-4 Audio/Visual Streams," Proposed Standard.
- RFC 6469 – "RTP Payload Format for DV (IEC 61834) Video," Proposed Standard.
- RFC 7310 – "RTP Payload Format for Standard apt-X and Enhanced apt-X Codecs," Proposed Standard.
- RFC 7587 – "RTP Payload Format for the Opus Speech and Audio Codec," Proposed Standard.
- RFC 7741 – "RTP Payload Format for VP8 Video," Proposed Standard.
- RFC 7798 – "RTP Payload Format for High Efficiency Video Coding (HEVC)," Proposed Standard.
- RFC 9134 – "RTP Payload Format for ISO/IEC 21122 (JPEG XS)," Proposed Standard.
- RFC 9607 – "RTP Payload Format for the Secure Communication Interoperability Protocol (SCIP) Codec," Proposed Standard.
- RFC 9628 – "RTP Payload Format for VP9 Video," Proposed Standard.

Payload identifiers 96–127 are used for payloads defined dynamically during a session. It is recommended to dynamically assign port numbers, although port numbers 5004 and 5005 have been registered for use of the profile when a dynamically assigned port is not required.

Applications should always support PCMU (payload type 0). Previously, DVI4 (payload type 5) was also recommended, but this was removed in 2013.

Payload type (PT)	Name	Type	No. of channels	Clock rate (Hz) (Note: The "clock rate" is the rate at which the timestamp in the RTP header is incremented, which need not be the same as the codec's sampling rate. For instance, video codecs typically use a clock rate of 90000 so their frames can be more precisely aligned with the RTCP NTP timestamp, even though video sampling rates are typically in the range of 1–60 samples per second.)	Frame size (byte)	Default packet interval (ms)	Description	References
0	PCMU	audio	1	8000	any	20	ITU-T G.711 PCM μ-Law audio 64 kbit/s	RFC 3551
1	reserved (previously FS-1016 CELP)	audio	1	8000			reserved, previously FS-1016 CELP audio 4.8 kbit/s	RFC 3551
2	reserved (previously G721 or G726-32)	audio	1	8000			reserved, previously ITU-T G.721 ADPCM audio 32 kbit/s or ITU-T G.726 audio 32 kbit/s	RFC 3551
3	GSM	audio	1	8000	20	20	European GSM Full Rate audio 13 kbit/s (GSM 06.10)	RFC 3551
4	G723	audio	1	8000	30	30	ITU-T G.723.1 audio	RFC 3551
5	DVI4	audio	1	8000	any	20	IMA ADPCM audio 32 kbit/s	RFC 3551
6	DVI4	audio	1	16000	any	20	IMA ADPCM audio 64 kbit/s	RFC 3551
7	LPC	audio	1	8000	any	20	Experimental Linear Predictive Coding audio 5.6 kbit/s	RFC 3551
8	PCMA	audio	1	8000	any	20	ITU-T G.711 PCM A-Law audio 64 kbit/s	RFC 3551
9	G722	audio	1	8000 (Note: Although the sampling rate for G.722 is 16000, its clock rate is 8000 to remain backwards compatible with RFC 1890, which incorrectly used this value.)	any	20	ITU-T G.722 audio 64 kbit/s	RFC 3551
10	L16	audio	2	44100	any	20	Linear PCM 16-bit Stereo audio 1411.2 kbit/s, uncompressed	RFC 3551
11	L16	audio	1	44100	any	20	Linear PCM 16-bit audio 705.6 kbit/s, uncompressed	RFC 3551
12	QCELP	audio	1	8000	20	20	Qualcomm Code Excited Linear Prediction	RFC 2658, RFC 3551
13	CN	audio	1	8000			Comfort noise. Payload type used with audio codecs that do not support comfort noise as part of the codec itself such as G.711, G.722.1, G.722, G.726, G.727, G.728, GSM 06.10, Siren, and RTAudio.	RFC 3389
14	MPA	audio	1, 2	90000	8–72		MPEG-1 or MPEG-2 audio only	RFC 2250, RFC 3551
15	G728	audio	1	8000	2.5	20	ITU-T G.728 audio 16 kbit/s	RFC 3551
16	DVI4	audio	1	11025	any	20	IMA ADPCM audio 44.1 kbit/s	RFC 3551
17	DVI4	audio	1	22050	any	20	IMA ADPCM audio 88.2 kbit/s	RFC 3551
18	G729	audio	1	8000	10	20	ITU-T G.729 and G.729a audio 8 kbit/s; Annex B is implied unless the annexb=no parameter is used	RFC 3551, RFC 4856
19	reserved (previously CN)	audio					reserved, previously comfort noise	RFC 3551
25	CELLB	video		90000			Sun CellB video	RFC 2029
26	JPEG	video		90000			JPEG video	RFC 2435
28	nv	video		90000			Xerox PARC's Network Video (nv)	RFC 3551
31	H261	video		90000			ITU-T H.261 video	RFC 4587
32	MPV	video		90000			MPEG-1 and MPEG-2 video	RFC 2250
33	MP2T	audio/video		90000			MPEG-2 transport stream	RFC 2250
34	H263	video		90000			H.263 video, first version (1996)	RFC 2190, RFC 3551
72–76	reserved						reserved because RTCP packet types 200–204 would otherwise be indistinguishable from RTP payload types 72–76 with the marker bit set	RFC 3550, RFC 3551
77–95	unassigned						note that RTCP packet type 207 (XR, Extended Reports) would be indistinguishable from RTP payload types 79 with the marker bit set	RFC 3551, RFC 3611
dynamic	H263-1998	video		90000			H.263 video, second version (1998)	RFC 2190, RFC 3551, RFC 4629
dynamic	H263-2000	video		90000			H.263 video, third version (2000)	RFC 4629
dynamic (or profile)	H264 AVC	video		90000			H.264 video (MPEG-4 Part 10)	RFC 6184
dynamic (or profile)	H264 SVC	video		90000			H.264 video	RFC 6190
dynamic (or profile)	H265	video		90000			H.265 video (HEVC)	RFC 7798
dynamic (or profile)	theora	video		90000			Theora video	draft-barbato-avt-rtp-theora
dynamic	iLBC	audio	1	8000	20, 30	20, 30	Internet low Bitrate Codec 13.33 or 15.2 kbit/s	RFC 3952
dynamic	PCMA-WB	audio	1	16000	5		ITU-T G.711.1 A-law	RFC 5391
dynamic	PCMU-WB	audio	1	16000	5		ITU-T G.711.1 μ-law	RFC 5391
dynamic	G718	audio		32000 (placeholder)	20		ITU-T G.718	draft-ietf-payload-rtp-g718
dynamic	G719	audio	(various)	48000	20		ITU-T G.719	RFC 5404
dynamic	G7221	audio		16000, 32000	20		ITU-T G.722.1 and G.722.1 Annex C	RFC 5577
dynamic	G726-16	audio	1	8000	any	20	ITU-T G.726 audio 16 kbit/s	RFC 3551
dynamic	G726-24	audio	1	8000	any	20	ITU-T G.726 audio 24 kbit/s	RFC 3551
dynamic	G726-32	audio	1	8000	any	20	ITU-T G.726 audio 32 kbit/s	RFC 3551
dynamic	G726-40	audio	1	8000	any	20	ITU-T G.726 audio 40 kbit/s	RFC 3551
dynamic	G729D	audio	1	8000	10	20	ITU-T G.729 Annex D	RFC 3551
dynamic	G729E	audio	1	8000	10	20	ITU-T G.729 Annex E	RFC 3551
dynamic	G7291	audio		16000	20		ITU-T G.729.1	RFC 4749
dynamic	GSM-EFR	audio	1	8000	20	20	ITU-T GSM-EFR (GSM 06.60)	RFC 3551
dynamic	GSM-HR-08	audio	1	8000	20		ITU-T GSM-HR (GSM 06.20)	RFC 5993
dynamic (or profile)	AMR	audio	(various)	8000	20		Adaptive Multi-Rate audio	RFC 4867
dynamic (or profile)	AMR-WB	audio	(various)	16000	20		Adaptive Multi-Rate Wideband audio (ITU-T G.722.2)	RFC 4867
dynamic (or profile)	AMR-WB+	audio	1, 2 or omit	72000	13.3–40		Extended Adaptive Multi Rate – WideBand audio	RFC 4352
dynamic (or profile)	vorbis	audio	(various)	(various)			Vorbis audio	RFC 5215
dynamic (or profile)	opus	audio	1, 2	48000 (Note: Because Opus can change sampling rates dynamically, its clock rate is fixed at 48000, even when the codec will be operated at a lower sampling rate. The maxplaybackrate and sprop-maxcapturerate parameters in SDP can be used to indicate hints/preferences about the maximum sampling rate to encode/decode.)	2.5–60	20	Opus audio	RFC 7587
dynamic (or profile)	speex	audio	1	8000, 16000, 32000	20		Speex audio	RFC 5574
dynamic	mpa-robust	audio	1, 2	90000	24–72		Loss-Tolerant MP3 audio	RFC 5219
dynamic (or profile)	MP4A-LATM	audio		90000 or others			MPEG-4 Audio (includes AAC)	RFC 6416
dynamic (or profile)	MP4V-ES	video		90000 or others			MPEG-4 Visual	RFC 6416
dynamic (or profile)	mpeg4-generic	audio/video		90000 or other			MPEG-4 Elementary Streams	RFC 3640
dynamic	VP8	video		90000			VP8 video	RFC 7741
dynamic	VP9	video		90000			VP9 video	RFC 9628
dynamic	AV1	video		90000			AV1 video	av1-rtp-spec
dynamic	L8	audio	(various)	(various)	any	20	Linear PCM 8-bit audio with 128 offset	RFC 3551
dynamic	DAT12	audio	(various)	(various)	any	20 (by analogy with L16)	IEC 61119 12-bit nonlinear audio	RFC 3190
dynamic	L16	audio	(various)	(various)	any	20	Linear PCM 16-bit audio	RFC 3551, RFC 2586
dynamic	L20	audio	(various)	(various)	any	20 (by analogy with L16)	Linear PCM 20-bit audio	RFC 3190
dynamic	L24	audio	(various)	(various)	any	20 (by analogy with L16)	Linear PCM 24-bit audio	RFC 3190
dynamic	raw	video		90000			Uncompressed Video	RFC 4175
dynamic	ac3	audio	(various)	32000, 44100, 48000			Dolby AC-3 audio	RFC 4184
dynamic	eac3	audio	(various)	32000, 44100, 48000			Enhanced AC-3 audio	RFC 4598
dynamic	t140	text		1000			Text over IP	RFC 4103
dynamic	EVRC; EVRC0; EVRC1	audio		8000			EVRC audio	RFC 4788
dynamic	EVRCB; EVRCB0; EVRCB1	audio		8000			EVRC-B audio	RFC 4788
dynamic	EVRCWB; EVRCWB0; EVRCWB1	audio		16000			EVRC-WB audio	RFC 5188
dynamic	jpeg2000	video		90000			JPEG 2000 video	RFC 5371
dynamic	UEMCLIP	audio		8000, 16000			UEMCLIP audio	RFC 5686
dynamic	ATRAC3	audio		44100			ATRAC3 audio	RFC 5584
dynamic	ATRAC-X	audio		44100, 48000			ATRAC3+ audio	RFC 5584
dynamic	ATRAC-ADVANCED-LOSSLESS	audio		(various)			ATRAC Advanced Lossless audio	RFC 5584
dynamic	DV	video		90000			DV video	RFC 6469
dynamic	BT656	video					ITU-R BT.656 video	RFC 3555
dynamic	BMPEG	video					Bundled MPEG-2 video	RFC 2343
dynamic	SMPTE292M	video					SMPTE 292M video	RFC 3497
dynamic	RED	audio					Redundant Audio Data	RFC 2198
dynamic	VDVI	audio					Variable-rate DVI4 audio	RFC 3551
dynamic	MP1S	video					MPEG-1 Systems Streams video	RFC 2250
dynamic	MP2P	video					MPEG-2 Program Streams video	RFC 2250
dynamic	tone	audio		8000 (default)			tone	RFC 4733
dynamic	telephone-event	audio		8000 (default)			DTMF tone	RFC 4733
dynamic	aptx	audio	2 – 6	(equal to sampling rate)	4000 ÷ sample rate	4 (Note: For aptX, the packetization interval must be rounded down to the nearest packet interval that can contain an integer number of samples. So at sampling rates of 11025, 22050, or 44100, a packetization rate of "4" is rounded down to 3.99.)	aptX audio	RFC 7310
dynamic	jxsv	video		90000			JPEG XS video	RFC 9134
dynamic	scip	audio/video		8000 or 90000			SCIP	RFC 9607

== See also ==
- Session Initiation Protocol
- H.323
- Comparison of audio coding formats
