= Wideband audio =

High-quality audio telephony

Audio bands in telephony
Name	Range (Hz)
Narrowband	300–3,400
Wideband	50–7,000
Superwideband	50–14,000
Fullband	20–20,000

Wideband audio, also known as wideband voice or HD voice, is high definition voice quality for telephony audio, contrasted with standard digital telephony "toll quality". It extends the frequency range of audio signals transmitted over telephone lines, resulting in higher quality speech. The range of the human voice extends from 100 Hz to 17 kHz but traditional, voiceband or narrowband telephone calls limit audio frequencies to the range of 300 Hz to 3.4 kHz. Wideband audio relaxes the bandwidth limitation and transmits in the audio frequency range of 50 Hz to 7 kHz. In addition, some wideband codecs may use a higher audio bit depth of 16 bits to encode samples, also resulting in much better voice quality.

Wideband codecs have a typical sample rate of 16 kHz. For superwideband codecs the typical value is 32 kHz.

== History ==
In 1987, the International Telecommunication Union (ITU) standardized a version of wideband audio known as G.722. Radio broadcasters began using G.722 over Integrated Services Digital Network (ISDN) to provide high-quality audio for remote broadcasts, such as commentary from sports venues. AMR-WB (G.722.2) was developed by Nokia and VoiceAge and it was first specified by 3GPP.

The traditional telephone network (PSTN) is generally limited to narrowband audio by the intrinsic nature of its transmission technology, TDM (time-division multiplexing), and by the analogue-to-digital converters used at the edge of the network, as well as the speakers, microphones and other elements in the endpoints themselves.

Wideband audio has been broadly deployed in conjunction with videoconferencing. Providers of this technology quickly discovered that despite the explicit emphasis on video transmission, the quality of the participant experience was significantly influenced by the fidelity of the associated audio signal.

Communications via Voice over Internet Protocol (VoIP) can readily employ wideband audio. When PC-to-PC calls are placed via VoIP services, such as Skype, and the participants use a high-quality headset, the resulting call quality can be noticeably superior to conventional PSTN calls. A number of audio codecs have emerged to support these services, supplementing G.722.

Manufacturers of audio conferencing equipment have introduced wideband-capable models that include support for G.722 over VoIP.

Conference calls are a direct beneficiary of the enhancements offered by wideband audio. Participants often struggle to figure out who is talking or to understand accented speakers. Misunderstandings are commonplace due primarily to generally poor audio quality and accumulation of background noise.

Some listener benefits cited of wideband audio compared to traditional (narrowband):

- Clearer overall sound quality
- Easier to recognize voices, distinguish confusing sounds and understand accented speakers
- Ease of deciphering words that have the close sounds of ‘s’ and ‘f’ and others, often indistinguishable over telephone lines
- Ability to hear faint talkers and to understand double-talk (when more than one person is speaking at the same time)
- Reduced listening effort (decreased cognitive load), resulting in increased productivity and lessened listener fatigue
- Better understanding amidst other impairments, such as when talkers are using a speakerphone or in the presence of background noise

Despite its reputation for poor audio quality, the mobile telephone industry has started to make some progress on wideband audio. The 3GPP standards group has designated G.722.2 as its wideband codec and calls it Adaptive Multirate – Wideband (AMR-WB). More than a hundred handsets have been introduced supporting this codec (for example, Apple, Google, HTC, Nokia, Samsung and Sony), and network demonstrations have been conducted.

== Deployment ==
=== VoIP ===
As business telephone systems have adopted VoIP technology, support for wideband audio has grown rapidly. Telephone sets from Avaya, Cisco, NEC Unified Solutions, Grandstream, Gigaset, Panasonic (which brands wideband audio "HD Sonic"), Polycom (which brands wideband audio "HD Voice"), Snom, AudioCodes (which brands wideband audio "HDVoIP") and others now incorporate G.722, as well as varying degrees of higher-quality audio components.

Suppliers of integrated circuits for telephony equipment, including DSP Group, Broadcom, Infineon, and Texas Instruments, include wideband audio in their feature portfolios. There are audio conferencing service providers that support wideband connections from these and other VoIP endpoints, while also permitting PSTN participants to join the conference in narrowband. sipXtapi is an open-source solution for VoIP media processing engine supporting wideband and HD voice that provides RTP and codecs through a plugin framework for use with SIP and other VoIP protocols. Skype uses an audio codec called Silk which allows for extremely high-quality audio.

A number of carriers around the world have rolled out HD voice services based on the G.722 wideband standard. In North America, hosted service providers have recently deployed the Aastra Hi-Q upgrade to its installed user base and as of January 2010 claimed around 70,000 HD voice endpoints. The consumer service provider ooma has an estimated 25,000 HD voice endpoints deployed stemming from its rollout of its second-generation Telo hardware.

=== VoLTE ===
In cellular communication, "HD Voice" specifically refers to AMR-WB (G.722.2) in VoLTE, but AMR-WB in turn does not specify quality or bitrate. Likewise for HD Voice+ and AMR-WB+. GSMA has an HD trademark and runs two certification program around the HD and HD+ logos.

AMR-WB is natively supported in Android since Android Gingerbread, and in iOS since the iPhone 5.

As of December 2015, a report announces 117 commercial mobile HD Voice networks launched in 76 countries.

Many mobile networks including AT&T and Verizon are discontinuing support for phones that don't support 4G and wideband audio.

== Wideband audio coding standards ==
The following are wideband audio coding standards and audio codecs used in telecommunication.

=== ITU-T ===
Year	Wideband audio coding standard	Wideband speech coding algorithm	Ref
1988	G.722	SB-ADPCM	
1999	G.722.1 (Siren7)	MDCT	
2003	G.722.2 (Adaptive Multi-Rate Wideband)	ACELP	
2006	G.729.1	MDCT	
2008	G.711.1	MDCT	
2008	G.718	MDCT	

=== GSMA ===
- HD Voice and HD Voice+ using Enhanced Voice Services (EVS) Codec

=== 3GPP ===
- TS 26.441 using Enhanced Voice Services (EVS) Codec

=== Others ===
- Extended Adaptive Multi-Rate – Wideband (AMR-WB+)
- Variable-Rate Multimode Wideband (VMR-WB)
- AAC-LD (MPEG-4 ER AAC-LD)
- Speex
- Skype SILK
- internet Speech Audio Codec (iSAC)
- Opus
