= Enhanced Voice Services =

Superwideband speech audio coding standard

Enhanced Voice Services (EVS)
- Internet media type: audio/EVS
- Developed by: Fraunhofer, JVCKenwood, Nippon Telegraph and Telephone, NTT Docomo, Panasonic, Ericsson
- Type of format: Lossy audio
- Standard: 3GPP TS 26.441, 26.442

Enhanced Voice Services (EVS) is a superwideband speech audio coding standard that was developed for VoLTE and VoNR. It offers up to 20 kHz audio bandwidth and has high robustness to delay jitter and packet losses due to its channel aware coding and improved packet loss concealment. It has been developed in 3GPP and is described in 3GPP TS 26.441. The application areas of EVS consist of improved telephony and teleconferencing, audiovisual conferencing services, and streaming audio. Source code of both decoder and encoder in ANSI C is available as 3GPP TS 26.442 and is being updated regularly. Samsung uses the term HD+ when doing a call using EVS.

== History ==
Work on EVS was started in 2007. The standardization process lasted from 2010 to 2014, being completed in December 2014 with 3GPP Release 12. The codec was developed collaboratively among chipset, handset and infrastructure manufacturers as well as operators and technology providers.

GSMA requires EVS for their HD Voice+ Logo Licensing Program.

The six patent holders are Fraunhofer IIS, JVC Kenwood, Nippon Telegraph and Telephone, NTT Docomo, Panasonic, and Ericsson. Other contributors included Huawei, Nokia, Orange, Qualcomm, Samsung Electronics, VoiceAge, and ZTE Corporation. A patent pool for EVS and IVAS has been listed by Via-LA.

== Technology ==
EVS employs similar concepts to its predecessors, such as AMR-WB, to which it retains backward-compatibility. It switches between speech and audio compression modes depending on the content, using ACELP and MDCT.

The following features are present in EVS:

- source-controlled variable bit-rate (SC-VBR)
- voice/sound activity detector (VAD)
- comfort noise generation (CNG)
- error concealment (EC) for packet loss in networks
- channel-aware mode to improve frame/packet error resilience
- jitter buffer management (JBM)

Input sampling rates for EVS can be 8, 16, 32, and 48 kHz. It supports the following bitrates (in kbps) for different bandwidths:

- Narrowband (NB): 5.9, 7.2, 8, 9.6, 13.2, 16.4, 24.4
- Wideband (WB): 5.9, 7.2, 8, 9.6, 13.2, 13.2 channel-aware, 16.4, 24.4, 32, 48, 64, 96, 128 (6.6 ~ 23.85 for AMR-WB IO)
- Super-wideband (SWB): 9.6, 13.2, 13.2 channel-aware, 16.4, 24.4, 32, 48, 64, 96, 128
- Fullband (FB): 16.4, 24.4, 32, 48, 64, 96, 128

Bitrates can be switched every 20 ms.

Subjective listening tests conducted by Nokia concluded that EVS offers significantly improved quality over AMR and AMR-WB at all operating points.

== Adoption ==
Operators which have launched EVS powered VoLTE services include:

- ETISALAT UAE
- NTT DoCoMo
- T-Mobile USA
- AT&T
- T-Mobile Polska
- Vodafone Germany
- Vodafone Romania
- Orange Romania
- Orange France
- Free France
- SK Telecom
- KT Corporation
- LG Uplus
- Deutsche Telekom
- KDDI Japan
- China Mobile
- EE United Kingdom
- Vodafone Netherlands
- KPN Netherlands
- Airtel India
- A1 Telekom Austria
- 3 Austria
- Swisscom
- Verizon Communications
- Turkcell
- TIM
- Wind Tre
- Vodafone Idea (V!) India
- Reliance Jio
- Telekom Hungary
- Telenor Hungary
- Vodafone New Zealand
- Magyar Telekom
- XL Axiata Indonesia
- Indosat Indonesia
- Viettel

As of 2024 there are about 200 models from different smartphones manufacturers supporting EVS, including:

- Apple
- Samsung
- Google
- HTC
- Huawei
- LG
- Motorola
- Nokia
- Panasonic
- Sony
- Xiaomi
- Fairphone

== Interoperability ==
Inter-carrier interoperability is a problem, as calls are by default routed over narrowband connections which downgrades the voice to narrowband quality instead of EVS and HD Voice even if the individual phones and carrier networks all support EVS. However, this does not mean it gets disabled though, the call remains on VoLTE or VoNR. Thus, users are encouraged to switch from phone calls to pure VoIP apps such as FaceTime, WhatsApp, Signal, Facebook Messenger, and Telegram when voice call quality remains poor despite good network connectivity. Still in some cases interoperator connection is implemented and phone call remains in EVS.

== Licensing ==
EVS, like AMR-WB and AMR-WB+, incorporates several patents. As with those two codecs, VoiceAge Corporation is in charge of the licensing and offers RAND pricing

== See also ==
- Comparison of audio coding formats
