= OSQ =

OSQ may refer to:

- Orchestre Symphonique de Québec, Canadian orchestra
- Original Sound Quality, audio file format
- Olympique Saint-Quentin, French football team
