= Dolby AC-4 =

Audio compression technology

Dolby AC-4 is an audio compression technology developed by Dolby Laboratories. Dolby AC-4 bitstreams can contain audio channels and/or audio objects. Dolby AC-4 has been adopted by the DVB project and standardized by the ETSI.

== History ==
Its development started in late 2011 to create a high-quality audio format to be used in streaming services, future TV broadcasts, and mainly to replace the traditional Dolby AC-3. AC-4 was standardized by the European Telecommunications Standards Institute (ETSI) under the code "TS 103 190" in April 2014, and in December 2014 Dolby Laboratories approved the sound format for commercial use.

On March 10, 2015, the Advanced Television Systems Committee (ATSC) announced that Dolby AC-4 was one of the three standards proposed for the audio system of ATSC 3.0.

On July 14, 2015, Dolby Laboratories announced that Sony Visual Products and Vizio would support Dolby AC-4.

On April 14, 2016, Dolby Laboratories announced that Samsung would ship TVs with support for Dolby AC-4 in 2017.

== Technical details ==
Dolby AC-4 can have up to 5.1 core audio channels which all Dolby AC-4 decoders are required to decode. Additional audio channels may be encoded as side signals which Dolby AC-4 decoders can optionally support which would allow for the delivery of 7.1.4 channel audio. Side signals may also contain audio objects. Dolby AC-4 has two different channel based encoding tools with Advanced Joint Channel Coding (A-JCC) used for low bit rates and Advanced Coupling (A-CPL) used for high bit rates. A-JCC doesn't support side signals and is limited to 5.1 channel audio while A-CPL does support side signals. Dolby AC-4 supports up to 7 audio objects with a core decoder and can optionally support additional audio objects with a more advanced decoder. The use of different decoders allows Dolby AC-4 to support lower cost devices while also allowing for more advanced decoders for AV receivers.

AC-4 uses an improved modified discrete cosine transform (MDCT) audio coding algorithm. Dolby states that Dolby AC-4 provides a 50% reduction in bit rate over Dolby Digital Plus. When Dolby AC-4 was tested by the DVB the Multiple Stimuli with Hidden Reference and Anchor test (MUSHRA) score was 90 at 192 kbit/s for 5.1 channel audio. When tested for ATSC 3.0 the bit rates needed for the required audio score was 96 kbit/s for stereo audio, 192 kbit/s for 5.1 channel audio, and 288 kbit/s for 7.1.4 channel audio. However, for 22.2 channel audio, the required bit rate may be as high as 1536 kbit/s.

Dolby AC-4 is extensible and audio substreams allow for new features to be added to Dolby AC-4 while maintaining compatibility with older decoders.

Dolby AC-4 is a lossy audio compression codec.

== Patent licensing ==
Dolby AC-4 is covered by patents and requires a license from Dolby Laboratories. Dolby AC-4 has a consumer royalty rate of US$0.15 to US$1.20 depending on the type of device and volume of sales. Dolby only charges for one technology per device, which means that Dolby AC-4 effectively costs nothing in devices that include existing Dolby technologies such as Dolby Digital Plus. The professional royalty rate is up to US$50 for an eight channel transcoder.

== See also ==
- Dolby Laboratories
- MPEG-H 3D Audio
- Comparison of audio coding formats
