= Adaptive Multi-Rate Wideband =

Wideband speech audio coding standard

G.722.2
- Wideband coding of speech at around 16 kbit/s using Adaptive Multi-Rate Wideband (AMR-WB)
- Status: In force
- Year started: 2002
- Latest version: (08/18); August 2018
- Organization: ITU-T
- Committee: ITU-T Study Group 16
- Domain: telecommunication
- License: Freely available
- Website: https://www.itu.int/rec/T-REC-G.722.2

Adaptive Multi-Rate Wideband (AMR-WB) is a patented wideband speech audio coding standard developed based on Adaptive Multi-Rate encoding, using a similar methodology to algebraic code-excited linear prediction (ACELP). AMR-WB provides improved speech quality due to a wider speech bandwidth of 50–7000 Hz compared to narrowband speech coders which in general are optimized for POTS wireline quality of 300–3400 Hz. AMR-WB was developed by Nokia and VoiceAge and it was first specified by 3GPP.

AMR-WB is codified as G.722.2, an ITU-T standard speech codec, formally known as Wideband coding of speech at around 16 kbit/s using Adaptive Multi-Rate Wideband (AMR-WB). G.722.2 AMR-WB is the same codec as the 3GPP AMR-WB. The corresponding 3GPP specifications are TS 26.190 for the speech codec and TS 26.194 for the Voice Activity Detector.

The AMR-WB format has the following parameters:

- Frequency bands processed: 50–6400 Hz (all modes) plus 6400–7000 Hz (23.85 kbit/s mode only)
- Delay frame size: 20 ms
- Look ahead: 5 ms
- AMR-WB codec employs a bandsplitting filter; the one-way delay of this filter is 0.9375 ms
- Complexity: 38 WMOPS, RAM 5.3 kilowords
- Voice activity detection, discontinuous transmission, comfort noise generator
- Fixed point: bit-exact C code
- Floating point: under work

A common file extension for the AMR-WB file format is .awb. There also exists another storage format for AMR-WB that is suitable for applications with more advanced demands on the storage format, like random access or synchronization with video. This format is the 3GPP-specified 3GP container format, based on the ISO base media file format. 3GP also allows use of AMR-WB bit streams for stereo sound.

== AMR modes ==
AMR-WB operates, like AMR, with nine different bit rates. The lowest bit rate providing excellent speech quality in a clean environment is 12.65 kbit/s. Higher bit rates are useful in background noise conditions and for music. Also, lower bit rates of 6.60 and 8.85 kbit/s provide reasonable quality, especially when compared to narrow-band codecs.

The frequencies from 6.4 kHz to 7 kHz are only transmitted in the highest bitrate mode (23.85 kbit/s), while in the rest of the modes the decoder generates sounds by using the lower frequency data (75–6400 Hz) along with random noise (in order to simulate the high frequency band).

All modes are sampled at 16 kHz (using 14-bit resolution) and processed at 12.8 kHz.

The bit rates are the following:

- Mandatory multi-rate configuration
  - 6.60 kbit/s (used for circuit switched GSM and UMTS connections; should only be used temporarily during bad radio connections and is not considered wideband speech)
  - 8.85 kbit/s (used for circuit switched GSM and UMTS connections; should only be used temporarily during bad radio connections and is not considered wideband speech; provides quality equal to G.722 at 48 kbit/s for clean speech)
  - 12.65 kbit/s (main anchor bitrate; used for circuit switched GSM and UMTS connections; offers superior audio quality to AMR at and above this bit rate; provides quality equal to or better than G722 at 56 kbit/s for clean speech)
- Higher bitrates for speech in adverse background noise environments, combined speech and music, and multi-party conferencing.
  - 14.25 kbit/s
  - 15.85 kbit/s
  - 18.25 kbit/s
  - 19.85 kbit/s
  - 23.05 kbit/s (not targeted for full-rate GSM channels)
  - 23.85 kbit/s (provides quality equal to G.722 at 64 kbit/s for clean speech; not targeted for full-rate GSM channels)

Notes: "The codec mode can be changed every 20 ms in 3G WCDMA channels and every 40 ms in GSM/GERAN channels. (For Tandem Free Operation interoperability with GSM/GERAN, mode change rate is restricted in 3G to 40 ms in AMR-WB encoders.)"

== Configurations for 3GPP ==
When used in mobile phone networks, there are three different configurations (combinations of bitrates) that may be used for voice channels:

- Configuration A (Config-WB-Code 0): 6.6, 8.85, and 12.65 kbit/s (Mandatory multi-rate configuration)
- Configuration B (Config-WB-Code 2): 6.6, 8.85, 12.65, and 15.85 kbit/s
- Configuration C (Config-WB-Code 4): 6.6, 8.85, 12.65, and 23.85 kbit/s

This limitation was designed to simplify the negotiation of bitrate between the handset and the base station, thus vastly simplifying the implementation and testing. All other bitrates can still be used for other purposes in mobile phone networks, including multimedia messaging, streaming audio, etc.

== Deployment ==
AMR-WB has been standardized by a mobile phone manufacturer consortium for future usage in networks such as UMTS. Its speech quality is high, but older networks will have to be upgraded to support a wideband codec.

In October 2006, the first AMR-WB tests were conducted in a deployed network by T-Mobile in Germany, in cooperation with Ericsson.

In 2007 an end-to-end AMR-WB TrFO capable 3G & VoIP product line was commercially released by NSN (M13.6 MSS, U3C MGW). AMR-WB TFO support was commercially released in 2008 (M14.2, U4.0). End-to-end TFO/TrFO negotiation and mid-call optimization (e.g. on handover, CF or CT events) was released in 2009 (M14.3, U4.1).

In late 2009, Orange UK announced that it would be introducing AMR-WB on its network in 2010. In France Orange S.A. and SFR are using AMR-WB format on their 3G+ networks since the end of summer 2010.

WIND Mobile in Canada launched HD Voice (AMR-WB) on its 3G+ network in February, 2011. WIND Mobile also announced that several handsets will support HD Voice (AMR-WB) in the first half of 2011, with the first one being Alcatel Tribe.

In January 2013, T-Mobile became the first GSM/UMTS based network in the US to enable AMR-WB.

In Feb 2013, Chunghwa Telecom became the first GSM/UMTS based network in Taiwan to enable AMR-WB.

In August 2013 the AMR-WB standard was introduced in Ukraine by Kyivstar.

Nokia developed the VMR-WB format for CDMA2000 networks, which is fully interoperable with 3GPP AMR-WB. AMR-WB is also a widely adapted format in mobile handsets for ringtones.

The AMR wideband speech format shall be supported in 3G multimedia services when wideband speech working at 16 kHz sampling frequency is supported. This requirement is defined in 3GPP technical specifications for IP Multimedia Subsystem (IMS), Multimedia Messaging Service (MMS) and Transparent end-to-end Packet-switched Streaming Service (PSS). In 3GPP specifications is AMR-WB format also used in 3GP container format.

== Licensing ==
The patent for AMR expired in 2024. Previously G.722.2 was licensed by VoiceAge Corporation.

== Tools ==
For encoding and decoding AMR-WB, an open-source library named OpenCORE exists. The OpenCORE codec can be used in ffmpeg.

For encoding, another open-source library exists as well, provided by VisualOn. It is included in the Android mobile operating system.

== See also ==
- Enhanced Voice Services (EVS)
- Adaptive Multi-Rate (AMR)
- Extended Adaptive Multi-Rate – Wideband (AMR-WB+)
- Half Rate
- Full Rate
- Enhanced Full Rate (EFR)
- G.722
- G.722.1
- 3GP
- Comparison of audio coding formats
- RTP audio video profile
- Wideband audio
