= G.722 =

ITU-T recommendation

- 7 kHz audio-coding within 64 kbit/s
- Status: In force
- Year started: 1988
- Latest version: (09/12); September 2012
- Organization: ITU-T
- Base standards: G.711
- Related standards: G.722.1, G.722.2, G.726
- Domain: audio compression
- License: Freely available
- Website: https://www.itu.int/rec/T-REC-G.722

G.722 is an ITU-T standard 7 kHz wideband audio codec operating at 48, 56 and 64 kbit/s. It was approved by ITU-T in November 1988. Technology of the codec is based on sub-band ADPCM (SB-ADPCM). The corresponding narrow-band codec based on the same technology is G.726.

G.722 provides improved speech quality due to a wider speech bandwidth of 50–7000 Hz compared to narrowband speech coders like G.711 which in general are optimized for POTS wireline quality of 300–3400 Hz. G.722 sample audio data at a rate of 16 kHz (using 14 bits), double that of traditional telephony interfaces, which results in superior audio quality and clarity.

Other ITU-T 7 kHz wideband codecs include G.722.1 and G.722.2. These codecs are not variants of G.722 and they use different patented compression technologies. G.722.1 is based on Siren codecs and offers lower bit-rate compressions (24 kbit/s or 32 kbit/s). It uses a modified discrete cosine transform (MDCT) audio coding data compression algorithm. A more recent G.722.2, also known as AMR-WB ("Adaptive Multirate Wideband") is based on ACELP and offers even lower bit-rate compressions (6.6 kbit/s to 23.85 kbit/s), as well as the ability to quickly adapt to varying compressions as the network topography mutates. In the latter case, bandwidth is automatically conserved when network congestion is high. When congestion returns to a normal level, a lower-compression, higher-quality bitrate is restored.

== Applications ==
G.722 is an ITU standard codec that provides 7 kHz wideband audio at data rates from 48, 56 and 64 kbit/s. This is useful for voice over IP applications, such as on a local area network where network bandwidth is readily available, and offers a significant improvement in speech quality over older narrowband codecs such as G.711, without an excessive increase in implementation complexity. Environments where bandwidth is more constrained may prefer one of the more bitrate-efficient codecs, such as G.722.1 (Siren7) or G.722.2 (AMR-WB).

G.722 has also been widely used by radio broadcasters for sending commentary-grade audio over a single 56 or 64 kbit/s ISDN B-channel (the least significant bit is dropped on 56 kb circuits).

G.722 works by having the inbound voice signal pass through a digital filter that splits the audio signal into 0 Hz-to-4 kHz and 4 kHz-to-8 kHz audio bands. These sub-bands are then encoded using sub-band ADPCM. Most of the human voice energy is concentrated in the lower half of the audio band (0–4 kHz), so 48 kbit/s of the bandwidth is dedicated to the lower sub-band and the other 16 kbit/s is allocated to the higher sub-band.

=== RTP encapsulation ===
G.722 VoIP is typically carried in RTP payload type 9. Note that IANA records the clock rate for type 9 G.722 as 8 kHz (instead of 16 kHz), RFC 3551 clarifies that this is due to a historical error and is retained in order to maintain backward compatibility. Consequently, correct implementations represent the value 8,000 where required but encode and decode audio at 16 kHz.

Whilst G.722 allows for bitrates of 64, 56 and 48 kbit/s, in practice, data is encoded at 64 kbit/s, with bits from the lower sub-band being used to encode auxiliary data. The greater the number of bits allocated to aux data, the lower the bit rate.

== Licensing ==
G.722 patents have expired, so it is freely available.

== See also ==
- List of codecs
- Comparison of audio coding formats
- Wideband audio
