= Modulated complex lapped transform =

The modulated complex lapped transform (MCLT) is a lapped transform, similar to the modified discrete cosine transform, that explicitly represents the phase (complex values) of the signal.

== See also ==
- MCLTReal Open source MCLT Forward/Reverse transform with scalar or SIMD vector support hosted at GITHUB: https://github.com/mewza/MCLT
- Modified discrete cosine transform
