= G.722.1 =

ITU-T Recommendation

- Low-complexity coding at 24 and 32 kbit/s for hands-free operation in systems with low frame loss
- Status: In force
- Year started: 1999
- Latest version: (05/05); May 2005
- Organization: ITU-T
- Base standards: G.711, G.722
- Related standards: G.722.2, G.726
- Domain: audio compression
- License: Freely available
- Website: https://www.itu.int/rec/T-REC-G.722.1

G.722.1 is a licensed royalty-free ITU-T standard audio codec providing high quality, moderate bit rate (24 and 32 kbit/s) wideband (50 Hz – 7 kHz audio bandwidth, 16 ksps (kilo-samples per second) audio coding. It is a partial implementation of Siren 7 audio coding format (which offers bit rates 16, 24, 32 kbit/s) developed by PictureTel Corp. (now Polycom, Inc.). Its official name is Low-complexity coding at 24 and 32 kbit/s for hands-free operation in systems with low frame loss. It uses a modified discrete cosine transform (MDCT) audio data compression algorithm.

G.722.1 Annex C (or G.722.1C) is a low-complexity extension mode to G.722.1, which doubles the algorithm to permit 14 kHz audio bandwidth using a 32 kHz audio sample rate, at 24, 32, and 48 kbit/s. It is included in the official ITU-T Recommendation G.722.1. The name of this annex is Annex C – 14 kHz mode at 24, 32, and 48 kbit/s. It is an implementation of the mono version of Polycom's Siren 14 audio coding format.

G.722.1 is the successor to PT716plus developed by PictureTel Corp. (now Polycom, Inc.), which has been used in videoconferencing systems for many years. As ITU-T Recommendation G.722.1, it was approved on September 30, 1999 after a four-year selection process involving extensive testing. G.722.1/Annex C was approved by ITU-T on May 14, 2005.

G.722.1 is a transform-based compressor that is optimized for both speech and music. The G.722.1 algorithm is based on lapped transform technology, using a Modulated Lapped Transform (MLT), a type of MDCT. The computational complexity is quite low (5.5 floating-point MIPS) for an efficient high-quality compressor, and the algorithmic delay end-to-end is 40 ms.

The numbering of the wideband ITU audio codecs is sometimes confusing. There are three principal codecs, which are unrelated, but all carrying the G.722 label. G.722 is the original 7 kHz codec, using ADPCM and operating at 48–64 kbit/s. G.722.1, another 7 kHz codec, operates at half the data rate while delivering comparable or better quality than G.722, but is a transform-based codec. G.722.1 Annex C is very similar to G.722.1, but provides twice the audio bandwidth, 14 kHz. And G.722.2, which operates on wideband speech and delivers very low bitrates, is an ACELP-based algorithm.

== Licensing ==
G.722.1 is available under a royalty-free license by Polycom Corporation, who owns all rights. Licensees also receive the right to use Polycom's 16 kbit/s decoder extension of G.722.1, as well as G.722.1 Annex C, and Polycom's IP within the new 20 kHz ITU fullband codec, G.719.

== See also ==
- List of codecs
- Comparison of audio coding formats
- Wideband audio
