= Wideband =

When a message's bandwidth significantly exceeds the system's coherence bandwidth

In communications, a system is wideband when the message bandwidth significantly exceeds the coherence bandwidth of the channel. Some communication links have such a high data rate that they are forced to use a wide bandwidth; other links may have relatively low data rates, but deliberately use a wider bandwidth than "necessary" for that data rate in order to gain other advantages; see spread spectrum.

A wideband antenna is one with approximately or exactly the same operating characteristics over a very wide passband. It is distinguished from broadband antennas, where the passband is large, but the antenna gain and/or radiation pattern needs not stay the same over the passband.

The term wideband audio or (also termed HD voice or wideband voice) denotes a telephony using a wideband codec, which uses a greater frequency range of the audio spectrum than conventional voiceband telephone calls, resulting in a clearer sound. Wideband in this context is usually considered to cover frequencies in the range of 50–7,000 Hz, therefore allowing audio with richer tones and better quality.

According to the United States Patent and Trademark Office, WIDEBAND is a registered trademark of WideBand Corporation, a US-based manufacturer of Gigabit Ethernet equipment.

Within Australia and New Zealand, the word WIDEBAND is a registered trademark of "Wideband Technology Pty Ltd", an Australian-based company specialising in data and communication equipment.

In some contexts wideband is distinguished from broadband in being broader.

== See also ==
- Narrowband
- Broadband
- Broadband Internet access
- Ultra-wideband
- Wideband audio
