= Interactive Multimedia Association =

The Interactive Multimedia Association (IMA) was an industry association which developed a set of audio algorithms. The most important is the ADPCM algorithm which is in use by Apple and Microsoft.

The Interactive Multimedia Association ceased operations around 1998. An archived copy of the document IMA Recommended Practices for Enhancing Digital Audio Compatibility in Multimedia Systems (version 3.0), which describes the IMA ADPCM algorithm, is available.
