= Sub-band coding =

Lossy audio coding technique

Sub-band coding and decoding signal flow diagram

In signal processing, sub-band coding (SBC) is any form of transform coding that breaks a signal into a number of different frequency bands, typically by using a fast Fourier transform, and encodes each one independently. This decomposition is often the first step in data compression for audio and video signals.

SBC is the core technique used in many popular lossy audio compression algorithms including MP3.

== Encoding audio signals ==
The simplest way to digitally encode audio signals is pulse-code modulation (PCM), which is used on audio CDs, DAT recordings, and so on. Digitization transforms continuous signals into discrete ones by sampling a signal's amplitude at uniform intervals and rounding to the nearest value representable with the available number of bits. This process is fundamentally inexact, and involves two errors: discretization error, from sampling at intervals, and quantization error, from rounding.

The more bits used to represent each sample, the finer the granularity in the digital representation, and thus the smaller the quantization error. Such quantization errors may be thought of as a type of noise, because they are effectively the difference between the original source and its binary representation. With PCM, the audible effects of these errors can be mitigated with dither and by using enough bits to ensure that the noise is low enough to be masked either by the signal itself or by other sources of noise. A high quality signal is possible, but at the cost of a high bitrate (e.g., over 700 kbit/s for one channel of CD audio). In effect, many bits are wasted in encoding masked portions of the signal because PCM makes no assumptions about how the human ear hears.

Coding techniques reduce bitrate by exploiting known characteristics of the auditory system. A classic method is nonlinear PCM, such as the μ-law algorithm. Small signals are digitized with finer granularity than are large ones; the effect is to add noise that is proportional to the signal strength. Sun's Au file format for sound is a popular example of mu-law encoding. Using 8-bit mu-law encoding would cut the per-channel bitrate of CD audio down to about 350 kbit/s, half the standard rate. Because this simple method only minimally exploits masking effects, it produces results that are often audibly inferior compared to the original.

== Basic principles ==
The utility of SBC is perhaps best illustrated with a specific example. When used for audio compression, SBC exploits auditory masking in the auditory system. Human ears are normally sensitive to a wide range of frequencies, but when a sufficiently loud signal is present at one frequency, the ear will not hear weaker signals at nearby frequencies. We say that the louder signal masks the softer ones.

The basic idea of SBC is to enable a data reduction by discarding information about frequencies which are masked. The result differs from the original signal, but if the discarded information is chosen carefully, the difference will not be noticeable, or more importantly, objectionable.

First, a digital filter bank divides the input signal spectrum into some number (e.g., 32) of subbands. The psychoacoustic model looks at the energy in each of these subbands, as well as in the original signal, and computes masking thresholds using psychoacoustic information. Each of the subband samples are quantized and encoded so as to keep the quantization noise below the dynamically computed masking threshold. The final step is to format all these quantized samples into groups of data called frames, to facilitate eventual playback by a decoder.

Decoding is much easier than encoding, since no psychoacoustic model is involved. The frames are unpacked, subband samples are decoded, and a frequency-time mapping reconstructs an output audio signal.

== Applications ==
Beginning in the late 1980s, a standardization body, the Moving Picture Experts Group (MPEG), developed standards for coding of both audio and video. Subband coding resides at the heart of the popular MP3 format (more properly known as MPEG-1 Audio Layer III), for example.

Sub-band coding is used in the G.722 codec which uses sub-band adaptive differential pulse code modulation (SB-ADPCM) within a bit rate of 64 kbit/s. In the SB-ADPCM technique, the frequency band is split into two sub-bands (higher and lower) and the signals in each sub-band are encoded using ADPCM.
