= Siren (codec) =

Audio codec

Siren is a family of patented, transform-based, wideband audio coding formats and their audio codec implementations developed and licensed by PictureTel Corporation (acquired by Polycom, Inc. in 2001). There are three Siren codecs: Siren 7, Siren 14 and Siren 22.

== Editions ==
Siren 7 (or Siren7 or simply Siren) provides 7 kHz audio, bit rates 16, 24, 32 kbit/s and sampling frequency 16 kHz. Siren is derived from PictureTel's PT716plus algorithm. In 1999, ITU-T approved G.722.1 recommendation, which is based on Siren 7 algorithm. It was approved after a four-year selection process involving extensive testing. G.722.1 provides only bit rates 24 and 32 kbit/s and does not support Siren 7's bit rate 16 kbit/s. The algorithm of Siren 7 is identical to its successor, G.722.1, although the data formats are slightly different.

Siren 14 (or Siren14) provides 14 kHz audio, bit rates 24, 32, 48 kbit/s for mono, 48, 64, 96 kbit/s for stereo and sampling frequency 32 kHz. Siren 14 supports stereo and mono audio. It offers 40 millisecond algorithmic delay, using 20 millisecond frame lengths. The mono version of Siren 14 became ITU-T G.722.1C (14 kHz, 24/32/48 kbit/s) in April 2005. The algorithm is based on transform coding technology, using a modulated lapped transform (MLT), a type of discrete cosine transform (DCT) or modified discrete cosine transform (MDCT).

Siren 22 (or Siren22) provides 22 kHz audio, sampling frequency 48 kHz, bit rates 64, 96, 128 kbit/s stereo and 32, 48, 64 kbit/s mono. Siren 22 offers 40 millisecond algorithmic delay using 20 millisecond frame lengths. In May 2008, ITU-T approved the new G.719 full-band codec which is based on Polycom Siren 22 audio technology and Ericsson's advanced audio techniques.

== Software support ==
Siren 7 is commonly used in videoconferencing systems and is also part of Microsoft Office Communicator when using A/V conferencing. Microsoft Office Communications Server uses Siren 7 during audio conferencing. With the default Office Communicator client, point to point audio is by default performed using Microsoft's proprietary codec RTAudio. When a call is promoted into an audio conference (any time 3 or more participants have joined), the codec is switched on the fly to Siren. This is done for performance reasons. Note that even if the conference is reduced to below 3 participants, OCS does not demote the conference to be point-to-point; it remains an A/V conference until the conference is terminated.

In Windows XP and later versions of Windows, the Siren 7 codec is implemented in %systemroot%\system32\SIRENACM.DLL. It is used by MSN Messenger and Live Messenger for sending and receiving voice clips and also as one of the available codecs for the 'Computer Call' feature.

FreeSWITCH communication open source software can do transcoding, conferencing and bridging of Siren 7/G.722.1 and Siren 14/G.722.1C audio formats.

aMSN, an open source Windows Live Messenger clone uses for Siren audio compression and decompression the "libsiren" library, an open source implementation of the codec, written by aMSN developer Youness Alaoui (KaKaRoTo) . The libsiren library has also been copied into libmsn and into the msn-pecan project, which provides plug-in for Pidgin and Adium instant messaging clients.

== Licensing ==
Usage of Siren 7 and Siren 14 audio coding formats require the licensing of patents from Polycom, in most countries. A royalty free licence for Siren 7 and Siren 14 is available from Polycom if certain fairly basic conditions are met.

Usage of Siren 22 also requires the licensing of patents from Polycom.

== See also ==
- Comparison of audio coding formats
- G.722.1
