= Original Sound Quality =

Audio file format

Original Sound Quality (OSQ) is an audio file format. OSQ was developed in 2002 by Steinberg Media Technologies GmbH and implemented e.g. in their audio editing software Wavelab 4 (and following releases) for lossless audio data compression.

In combination with good source material this format allows compression rates up to 50%. Because of that it is not comparable to other audio formats like MP3, which reach compression rates up to 90% because of their lossy compression algorithms. Therefore, OSQ is used rather for archiving than for daily use.

OSQ is a proprietary format developed by Steinberg that is generally speaking not supported by other audio software tools. A possible alternative to OSQ might be the free codec FLAC.

== Sources ==
- Translation of German Wikipedia article
