= Long-term prediction (communications) =

In GSM, a Regular Pulse Excitation-Long Term Prediction (RPE-LTP) scheme is employed in order to reduce the amount of data sent between the mobile station (MS) and base transceiver station (BTS).

In essence, when a voltage level of a particular speech sample is quantified, the mobile station's internal logic predicts the voltage level for the next sample. When the next sample is quantified, the packet sent by the MS to the BTS contains only the error (the signed difference between the actual and predicted level of the sample).

== See also ==
- GSM
- Quantization (signal processing)
