= Voice frequency =

Audio frequencies used for the transmission of speech

Audio bands in telephony
Name	Range (Hz)
Narrowband	300–3,400
Wideband	50–7,000
Superwideband	50–14,000
Fullband	20–20,000

A voice frequency (VF) or voice band is the range of audio frequencies used for the transmission of speech.

== Frequency band ==
In telephony, the usable voice frequency band ranges from approximately 300 to 3400 Hz. It is for this reason that the ultra low frequency band of the electromagnetic spectrum between 300 and 3000 Hz is also referred to as voice frequency, being the electromagnetic energy that represents acoustic energy at baseband. The bandwidth allocated for a single voice-frequency transmission channel is usually 4 kHz, including guard bands, allowing a sampling rate of 8 kHz to be used as the basis of the pulse-code modulation system used for the digital PSTN. Per the Nyquist–Shannon sampling theorem, the sampling frequency (8 kHz) must be at least twice the highest component of the voice frequency (4 kHz) via appropriate filtering prior to sampling at discrete times for effective reconstruction of the voice signal.

== Fundamental frequency ==
The voiced speech of a typical adult male will have a fundamental frequency from 90 to 155 Hz, and that of a typical adult female from 165 to 255 Hz. Thus, the fundamental frequency of most speech falls below the bottom of the voice frequency band as defined. However, enough of the harmonic series will be present for the missing fundamental to create the impression of hearing the fundamental tone.

== Wavelength ==
The speed of sound at room temperature (20°C) is 343.15 m/s. Using the formula

$$\text{Wavelength} = \frac{\text{Speed}}{\text{Frequency}},$$

we have:

Typical female voices range from 1.3 metres (4 ft) to 2 metres (7 ft).

Typical male voices range from 2.2 metres (7 ft) to 4 metres (13 ft).

== See also ==
- Formant
- Hearing (sense)
- Voice call
