= Adaptive differential pulse-code modulation =

Technique used to encode voices in telephony

Adaptive differential pulse-code modulation (ADPCM) is a variant of differential pulse-code modulation (DPCM) that varies the size of the quantization step, to allow further reduction of the required data bandwidth for a given signal-to-noise ratio.

Typically, the adaptation to signal statistics in ADPCM consists simply of an adaptive scale factor before quantizing the difference in the DPCM encoder.

ADPCM was developed for speech coding by P. Cummiskey, Nikil S. Jayant and James L. Flanagan at Bell Labs in 1973.

== In telephony ==
In telephony, a standard audio signal for a single phone call is encoded as 8000 analog samples per second, of 8 bits each, giving a 64 kbit/s digital signal known as DS0. The default signal compression encoding on a DS0 is either μ-law (mu-law) PCM (North America and Japan) or A-law PCM (Europe and most of the rest of the world). These are logarithmic compression systems where a 13- or 14-bit linear PCM sample number is mapped into an 8-bit value. This system is described by international standard G.711. Where circuit costs are high and loss of voice quality is acceptable, it sometimes makes sense to compress the voice signal even further. An ADPCM algorithm is used to map a series of 8-bit μ-law (or a-law) PCM samples into a series of 4-bit ADPCM samples. In this way, the capacity of the line is doubled. The technique is detailed in the G.726 standard.

ADPCM techniques are used in voice over IP communications. In the early 1990s, ADPCM was also used by Interactive Multimedia Association to develop the legacy audio codecs ADPCM DVI, IMA ADPCM, and DVI4.

== Split-band or subband ADPCM ==
G.722 is an ITU-T standard wideband speech codec operating at 48, 56 and 64 kbit/s, based on sub-band coding with two channels and ADPCM coding of each. Before the digitization process, it catches the analog signal and divides it in frequency bands with quadrature mirror filters (QMF) to get two subbands of the signal. When the ADPCM bitstream of each subband is obtained, the results are multiplexed, and the next step is storage or transmission of the data. The decoder has to perform the reverse process, that is, demultiplex and decode each subband of the bitstream and recombine them.

Referring to the coding process, in some applications as voice coding, the subband that includes the voice is coded with more bits than the others. It is a way to reduce the file size.

== Software ==
The Windows Sound System supported ADPCM in WAV files.

As of 31 October 2024, FFmpeg includes 50 built-in ADPCM decoders and 16 encoders, some catering to niche purposes. For instance, "ADPCM Westwood Studios IMA" (adpcm_ima_ws) encodes and decodes the audio of the old Command & Conquer video games.

The DSP in the GameCube supports ADPCM encoding on 64 simultaneous audio channels.

== See also ==
- Audio coding format
- Audio data compression
- Pulse-code modulation (PCM)
