= Audio coding format =

Digitally coded format for audio signals

Comparison of coding efficiency between popular audio formats

An audio coding format, or audio compression format, is an encoded format of digital audio, such as in digital television, digital radio and in audio and video files. Examples of audio coding formats include MP3, AAC, Vorbis, FLAC, and Opus. A specific software or hardware implementation capable of audio compression and decompression to/from a specific audio coding format is called an audio codec; an example of an audio codec is LAME, which is one of several different codecs which implements encoding and decoding audio in the MP3 audio coding format in software.

Some audio coding formats are documented by a detailed technical specification document known as an audio coding specification. Some such specifications are written and approved by standardization organizations as technical standards, and are thus known as an audio coding standard. The term "standard" is also sometimes used for de facto standards as well as formal standards.

Audio content encoded in a particular audio coding format is normally encapsulated within a container format. As such, the user normally doesn't have a raw AAC file, but instead has a .m4a audio file, which is a MPEG-4 Part 14 container containing AAC-encoded audio. The container also contains metadata such as title and other tags, and perhaps an index for fast seeking. A notable exception is MP3 files, which are raw audio coding without a container format. De facto standards for adding metadata tags such as title and artist to MP3s, such as ID3, are hacks which work by appending the tags to the MP3, and then relying on the MP3 player to recognize the chunk as malformed audio coding and therefore skip it. In video files with audio, the encoded audio content is bundled with video (in a video coding format) inside a multimedia container format.

An audio coding format does not dictate all algorithms used by a codec implementing the format. An important part of how lossy audio compression works is by removing data in ways humans can't hear, according to a psychoacoustic model; the implementer of an encoder has some freedom of choice in which data to remove (according to their psychoacoustic model).

== Lossless, lossy, and uncompressed audio coding formats ==
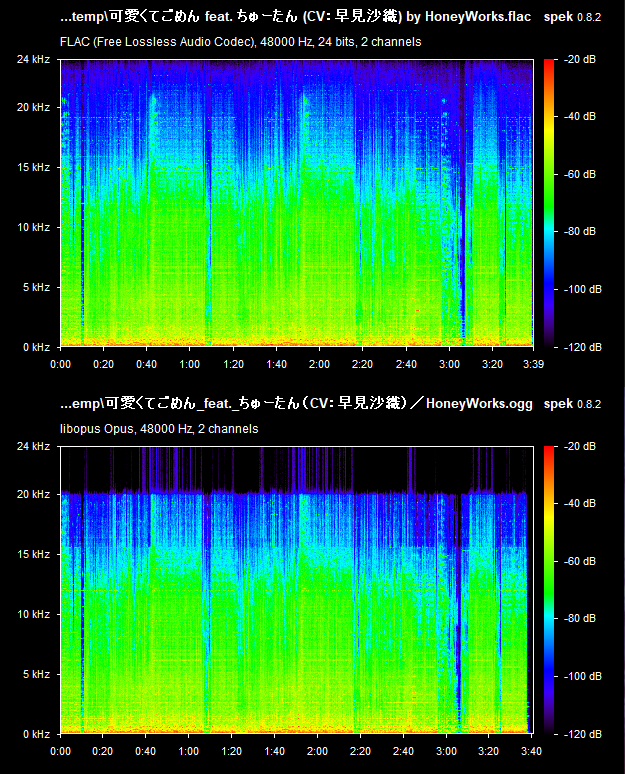
Spectral analysis comparison between lossless FLAC (top) and lossy Opus (bottom) files for the same audio clip. The 20-24 kHz range is absent in the lossy audio file.

A lossless audio coding format reduces the total data needed to represent a sound but can be de-coded to its original, uncompressed form. A lossy audio coding format additionally reduces the bit resolution of the sound on top of compression, which results in far less data at the cost of irretrievably lost information.

Transmitted (streamed) audio is most often compressed using lossy audio codecs as the smaller size is far more convenient for distribution. The most widely used audio coding formats are MP3 and Advanced Audio Coding (AAC), both of which are lossy formats based on modified discrete cosine transform (MDCT) and perceptual coding algorithms.

Lossless audio coding formats such as FLAC and Apple Lossless are sometimes available, though at the cost of larger files.

Uncompressed audio formats, such as pulse-code modulation (PCM, or .wav), are also sometimes used. PCM was the standard format for Compact Disc Digital Audio (CDDA).

== History ==
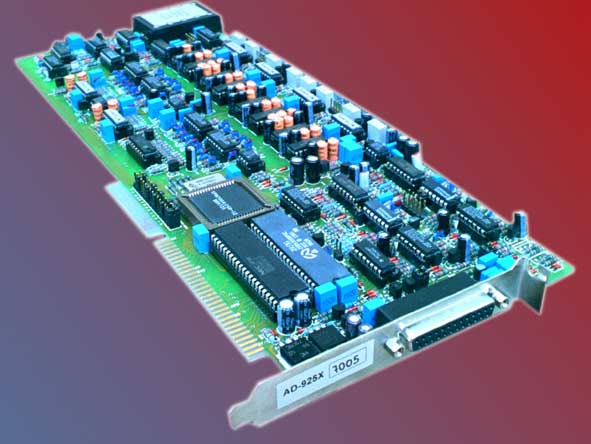
Solidyne 922: The world's first commercial audio bit compression sound card for PC, 1990

In 1950, Bell Labs filed the patent on differential pulse-code modulation (DPCM). Adaptive DPCM (ADPCM) was introduced by P. Cummiskey, Nikil S. Jayant and James L. Flanagan at Bell Labs in 1973.

Perceptual coding was first used for speech coding compression, with linear predictive coding (LPC). Initial concepts for LPC date back to the work of Fumitada Itakura (Nagoya University) and Shuzo Saito (Nippon Telegraph and Telephone) in 1966. During the 1970s, Bishnu S. Atal and Manfred R. Schroeder at Bell Labs developed a form of LPC called adaptive predictive coding (APC), a perceptual coding algorithm that exploited the masking properties of the human ear, followed in the early 1980s with the code-excited linear prediction (CELP) algorithm which achieved a significant compression ratio for its time. Perceptual coding is used by modern audio compression formats such as MP3 and AAC.

Discrete cosine transform (DCT), developed by Nasir Ahmed, T. Natarajan and K. R. Rao in 1974, provided the basis for the modified discrete cosine transform (MDCT) used by modern audio compression formats such as MP3 and AAC. MDCT was proposed by J. P. Princen, A. W. Johnson and A. B. Bradley in 1987, following earlier work by Princen and Bradley in 1986. The MDCT is used by modern audio compression formats such as Dolby Digital, MP3, and Advanced Audio Coding (AAC).

== List of lossy formats ==
=== General ===
Basic compression algorithm	Audio coding standard	Abbreviation	Introduction	Market share (2023)		Ref
Basic compression algorithm	Audio coding standard	Abbreviation	Introduction	Production	Streaming	
Modified discrete cosine transform (MDCT)	Dolby Digital (AC-3)	AC3	1991	36–54% (Note: The report combines AC-3 & E-AC-3 and separates Dolby Atmos from its market share calculation. Dolby Atmos can be encoded either lossily with E-AC-3/AC-4 or losslessly with Dolby TrueHD. Music and video streaming providers typically use Dolby Digital Plus augmented with Dolby Atmos, whereas digital downloads and Blu-ray discs typically use Dolby TrueHD augmented with Dolby Atmos.)	37–61%	
Modified discrete cosine transform (MDCT)	Dolby Digital Plus (E-AC-3)	EAC3	2004	36–54%	37–61%	
Modified discrete cosine transform (MDCT)	Adaptive Transform Acoustic Coding	ATRAC	1992	Unknown	Unknown	
Modified discrete cosine transform (MDCT)	MPEG Layer III	MP3	1993	15%	19%	
Modified discrete cosine transform (MDCT)	Advanced Audio Coding (MPEG-2 / MPEG-4)	AAC	1997	83%	87%	
Modified discrete cosine transform (MDCT)	Windows Media Audio	WMA	1999	Unknown	Unknown	
Modified discrete cosine transform (MDCT)	Ogg Vorbis	Ogg	2000	6%	4%	
Modified discrete cosine transform (MDCT)	Constrained Energy Lapped Transform	CELT	2011	—N/a	—N/a	
Modified discrete cosine transform (MDCT)	Opus	Opus	2012	12%	9%	
Modified discrete cosine transform (MDCT)	Dolby AC-4	AC4	2014	Unknown	Unknown	
Modified discrete cosine transform (MDCT)	LDAC	LDAC	2015	Unknown	Unknown	
Adaptive differential pulse-code modulation (ADPCM)	aptX / aptX-HD	aptX	1989	Unknown	Unknown	
Adaptive differential pulse-code modulation (ADPCM)	Digital Theater Systems	DTS	1990	8%	6%	
Adaptive differential pulse-code modulation (ADPCM)	Master Quality Authenticated	MQA	2014	Unknown	Unknown	
Sub-band coding (SBC)	MPEG-1 Audio Layer II	MP2	1993	Unknown	Unknown	
Sub-band coding (SBC)	Musepack	MPC	1997	Unknown	Unknown	
Sub-band coding (SBC)	SBC	SBC	2003	Unknown	Unknown	

=== Speech ===
- Linear predictive coding (LPC)
  - Adaptive predictive coding (APC)
  - Code-excited linear prediction (CELP)
  - Algebraic code-excited linear prediction (ACELP)
  - Relaxed code-excited linear prediction (RCELP)
  - Low-delay CELP (LD-CELP)
  - Adaptive Multi-Rate (used in GSM and 3GPP)
  - Codec 2 (noted for its lack of patent restrictions)
  - Speex (noted for its lack of patent restrictions)
- Modified discrete cosine transform (MDCT)
  - AAC-LD
  - Constrained Energy Lapped Transform (CELT)
  - Opus (mostly for real-time applications)

== List of lossless formats ==
- Apple Lossless (ALAC – Apple Lossless Audio Codec)
- Adaptive Transform Acoustic Coding (ATRAC)
- Audio Lossless Coding (also known as MPEG-4 ALS)
- Direct Stream Transfer (DST)
- Dolby TrueHD
- DTS-HD Master Audio
- Free Lossless Audio Codec (FLAC)
- Lossless discrete cosine transform (LDCT)
- Meridian Lossless Packing (MLP)
- Monkey's Audio (Monkey's Audio APE)
- MPEG-4 SLS (also known as HD-AAC)
- OptimFROG
- Original Sound Quality (OSQ)
- RealPlayer (RealAudio Lossless)
- Shorten (SHN)
- TTA (True Audio Lossless)
- WavPack (WavPack lossless)
- WMA Lossless (Windows Media Lossless)

== See also ==
- Comparison of audio coding formats
- Data compression#Audio
- Audio file format
- List of audio compression formats
