= Lag windowing =

Lag windowing is a technique that consists of windowing the autocorrelation coefficients prior to estimating linear prediction coefficients (LPC). The windowing in the autocorrelation domain has the same effect as a convolution (smoothing) in the power spectral domain and helps in stabilizing the result of the Levinson-Durbin algorithm. The window function is typically a Gaussian function.

== See also ==
- Linear predictive coding
- Bandwidth expansion
