= Bandwidth expansion =

Technique for widening the bandwidth or the resonances in an LPC filter

Bandwidth expansion is a technique for widening the bandwidth or the resonances in an LPC filter. This is done by moving all the poles towards the origin by a constant factor $\gamma$. The bandwidth-expanded filter $A'(z)$ can be easily derived from the original filter $A(z)$ by:

$$A'(z) = A(z/\gamma)$$

Let $A(z)$ be expressed as:

$$A(z) = \sum_{k=0}^{N}a_kz^{-k}$$

The bandwidth-expanded filter can be expressed as:

$$A'(z) = \sum_{k=0}^{N}a_k\gamma^kz^{-k}$$

In other words, each coefficient $a_k$ in the original filter is simply multiplied by $\gamma^k$ in the bandwidth-expanded filter. The simplicity of this transformation makes it attractive, especially in CELP coding of speech, where it is often used for the perceptual noise weighting and/or to stabilize the LPC analysis. However, when it comes to stabilizing the LPC analysis, lag windowing is often preferred to bandwidth expansion.
