= RELP =

- Residual-excited linear prediction
- Reliable Event Logging Protocol for data logging in computer networks
- Real Estate Limited Partnership
- Real Estate Lenders Policy
- Regenerating protein-like protein
- Real-e-live-People
- Rassemblement des Étudiants Libanais à Paris
- Relationship Pattern
