= KY 3 =

KY 3 may refer to:

- KY-3, a secure US federal government telephone system
- Kentucky Route 3
- Kentucky's 3rd congressional district
- The on-air branding for KYTV (TV) channel 3, an NBC affiliate in Springfield, Missouri
