= National Cryptologic Museum =

Museum in Maryland, U.S.

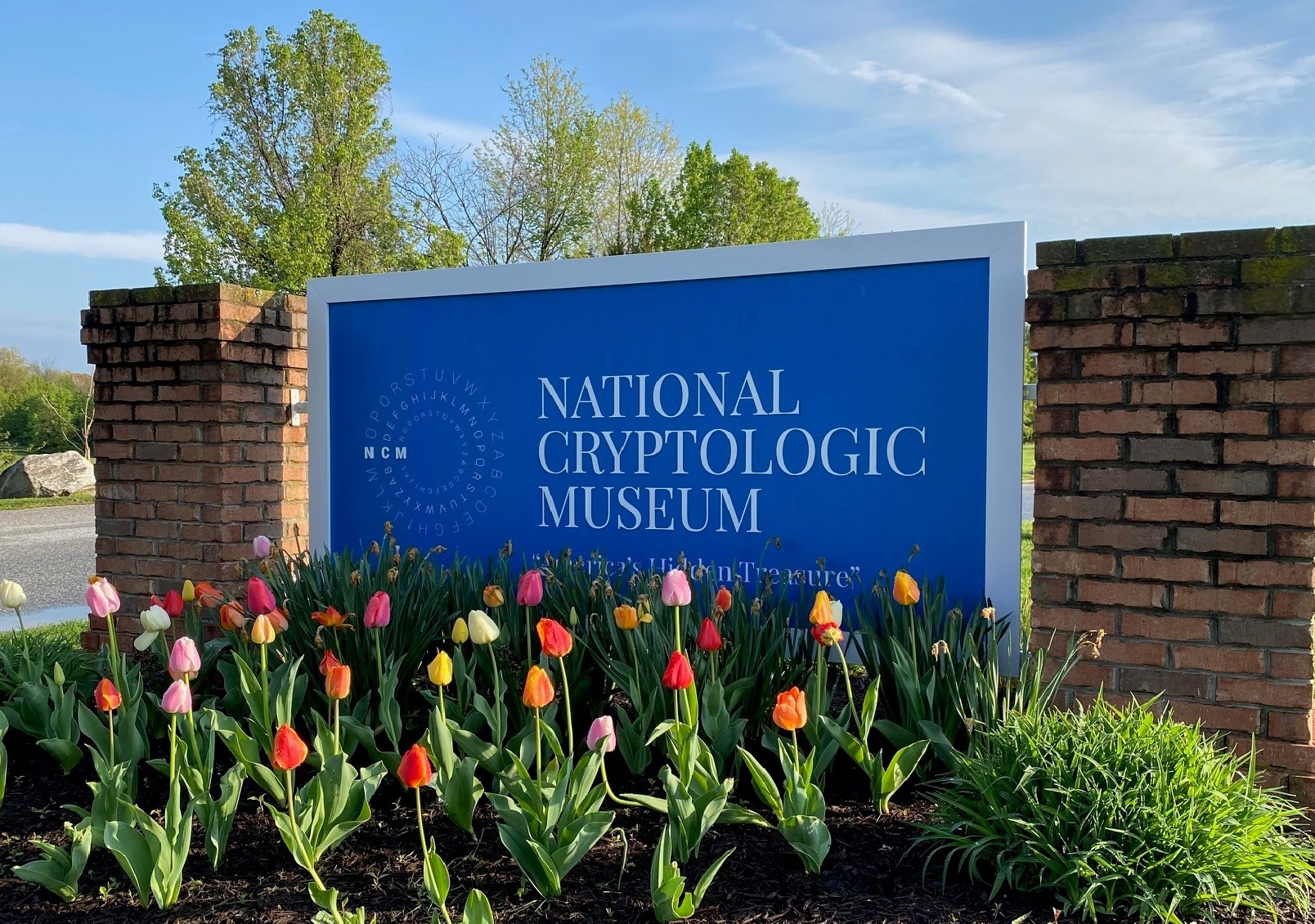
- Front entrance

- Location within Maryland
- Established: 1993
- Location: 8290 Colony Seven Road; Annapolis Junction, Maryland 20701; United States of America
- Coordinates: 39.1148°N 76.7748°W
- Type: History
- Visitors: 50,000 annually
- Director: Vince Houghton
- Website: www.nsa.gov/about/cryptologic-heritage/museum/

The National Cryptologic Museum (NCM) is an American museum of cryptologic history that is affiliated with the National Security Agency (NSA). The first public museum in the U.S. Intelligence Community, NCM is located in the former Colony Seven Motel, just two blocks from the NSA headquarters at Fort George G. Meade in Maryland. The motel was purchased, creating a buffer zone between the high security main buildings of the NSA and an adjacent highway. The museum opened to the public on December 16, 1993, and now hosts about 50,000 visitors annually from all over the world.

The National Vigilance Park (NVP) was next to the museum, where three reconnaissance aircraft were displayed. A U.S. Army Beechcraft RU-8D Seminole reconnaissance plane represents the Army Airborne Signals Intelligence contribution in the Vietnam War. A Lockheed C-130 Hercules transport, modified to look like a reconnaissance-configured C-130A, memorialized a U.S. Air Force aircraft shot down over Soviet Armenia during the Cold War. Finally, the park also contained a U.S. Navy Douglas EA-3B Skywarrior, commemorating a mission in the Mediterranean on January 25, 1987, in which all seven crew members died.

The NCM is open to the public, and admission is free. Donations to the NCM Foundation are accepted. Photography is allowed inside the museum but flash photography is prohibited due to the age of some of the artifacts. The museum temporarily closed in 2020 due to the COVID-19 pandemic. Later in 2020, new museum director Vince Houghton used the opportunity to have the museum renovated. It reopened on October 8, 2022.

The NCM is open Tuesday through Friday, 10am–4pm. It is closed on Sundays and all federal holidays, and operates on NSA's emergency/weather closure schedule (i.e. if NSA is closed, the museum is closed as well). The NCM includes a gift store whose operational hours coordinate with the museum's operational schedule and an unclassified library with weekday-only operating hours. The library includes over a dozen boxes of the files of Herbert Yardley, declassified Enigma messages, technical reports, and books including how to crack the Data Encryption Standard using Deep Crack.

== Collections ==
The NCM collection contains thousands of artifacts, including numerous working World War II German Enigma machines (two of them are available for visitors to try out), and a Navy Bombe used to break it. Displays discuss the history of American cryptology and the people, machines, techniques, and locations concerned. Initially housing NSA artifacts for viewing by employees, the museum quickly developed into a collection of U.S. cryptologic history, with some artifacts dating back to pre-American Revolutionary War times.

In addition to exhibits covering equipment used to encrypt, decrypt, and secure information, the museum features exhibits on the people who contributed to cryptography in America, such as George Washington (who integrated military intelligence tactics, including coded messaging, into the Continental Army during the Revolutionary War), the Native American code talkers (who protected U.S. communications during both World Wars by using their native languages to encode message traffic), and the Navy WAVES (who, like the WRENS of the British Royal Navy, operated the Bombe to decrypt German military traffic during WWII).

Collections are divided into four major groupings:

- Early Cryptology, which deals with cryptologic history prior to the formation of NSA, with exhibits dating back to the 16th century (the Renaissance-era book Polygraphiae) forward to the early 1950s, focusing on artifacts from the Founding Fathers of the United States, the American Civil War, the United States Army Code talkers, World War I, and World War II.
- Cold War/Information Age, which deals with cryptology and cryptanalysis on both sides of the Cold War, the early years of NSA, and the rise of the modern age of computers, including the development of supercomputers
- Information Assurance, which deals with the rise of satellite technology, secure voice communications, tamper-evident technologies, nuclear command and control, and cyberdefense.
- Memorial Hall, one side of which features the NSA Hall of Honor, and the other side of which features exhibits honoring those who lost their lives in cryptologic missions represented by the aircraft at NVP as well as others who lost their lives in cryptologic service to America (USS Pueblo, USS Liberty, and a replica of NSA's National Cryptologic Memorial)

In addition, there are galleries throughout NCM focusing on the roles of women and African-Americans in cryptologic history, and the variety of languages in use throughout the world. In early 2025 some of these galleries' plaques were initially considered subject to censorship in response to Trump Administration directives on diversity, equity, and inclusion.

The NCM includes an unclassified library of books, papers, and other materials relating to the history of cryptography and cryptology as well. The library is open on days when the museum is open. The library is non-circulating (that is, material cannot be borrowed or checked out by the public), but photocopying and photography are allowed. Patrons needing extensive or rare materials for research are encouraged to contact the museum to schedule an appointment with the librarian.

The size of NCM's library nearly doubled with the donation of an extensive collection of papers, books, and other artifacts related to codes and ciphers from cryptologic historian and author David Kahn. The donation was formally dedicated by the NCM during a recognition ceremony for Dr. Kahn on October 26, 2010.

== Activities ==
The museum offers tours for members of the public, both scheduled and walk-in, that describe cryptology's impact on history and jobs in the field. Tours are led by docents who are retired NSA employees. Groups of six persons or more are requested to contact the museum in advance to schedule tours and ensure docent availability.

In addition, the NCM offers educational field trips, tours, talks, and interactive programs for students aged from 9, as well as programs for Boy Scouts and Girl Scouts of all ages to satisfy various pins, requirements, and electives. Interested educators, scoutmasters, and troop leaders are encouraged to contact the museum for more details.

The NCM was the site of the 2010 activation ceremony for Marine Corps Forces, Cyberspace Command. The ceremony was attended by former CMC General Alfred M. Gray, Jr.

== NSA Hall of Honor ==
The NSA Hall of Honor is a memorial honoring individuals with distinguished service to American cryptology. Created in 1999, the standards are high for induction; honored individuals were innovators over their entire careers, whose expertise in various NSA subject matters far surpassed any of their peers, or who made major contributions to the structure and processes of American cryptology.

== Photo gallery ==
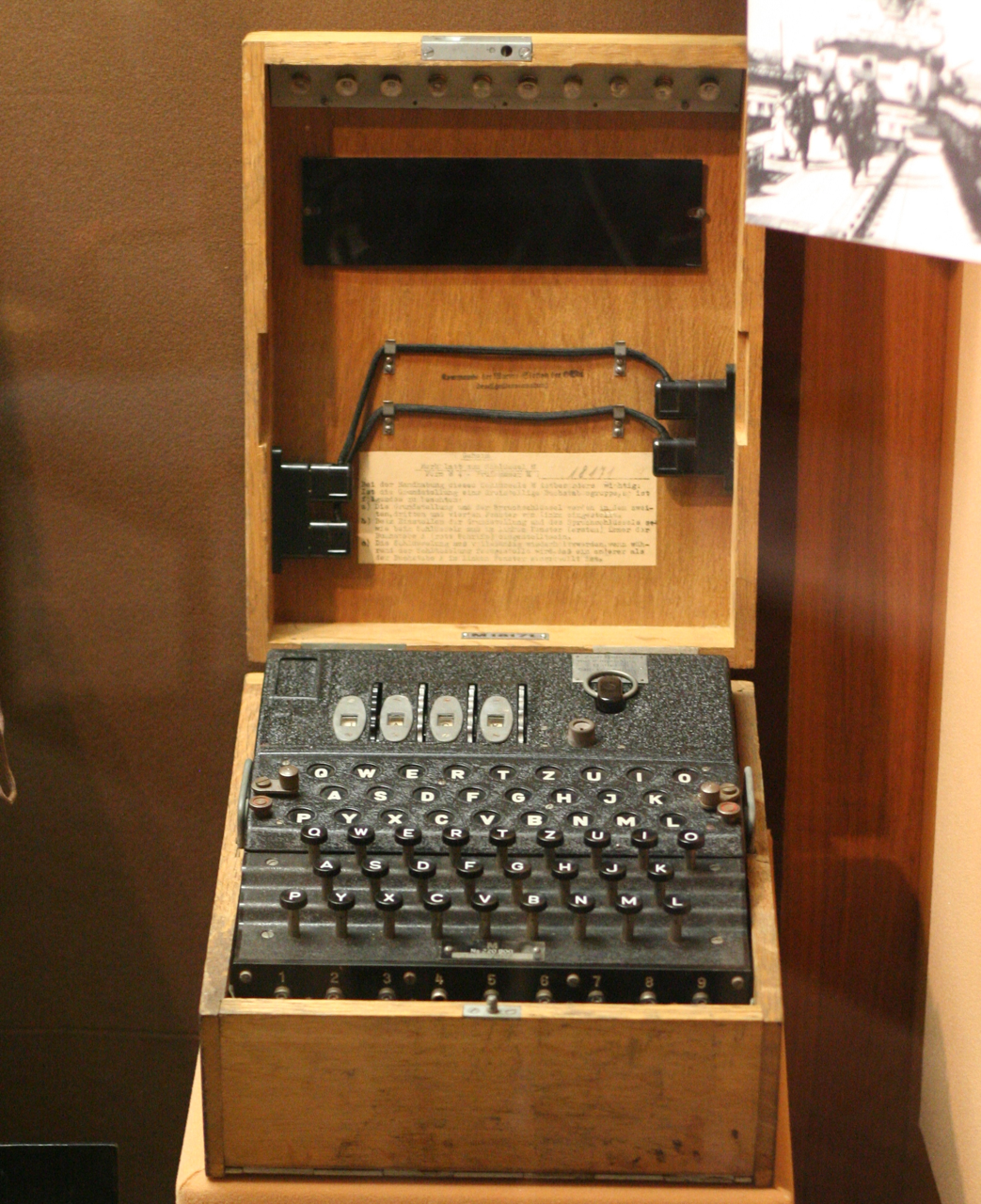
Four-rotor Kriegsmarine Enigma machine

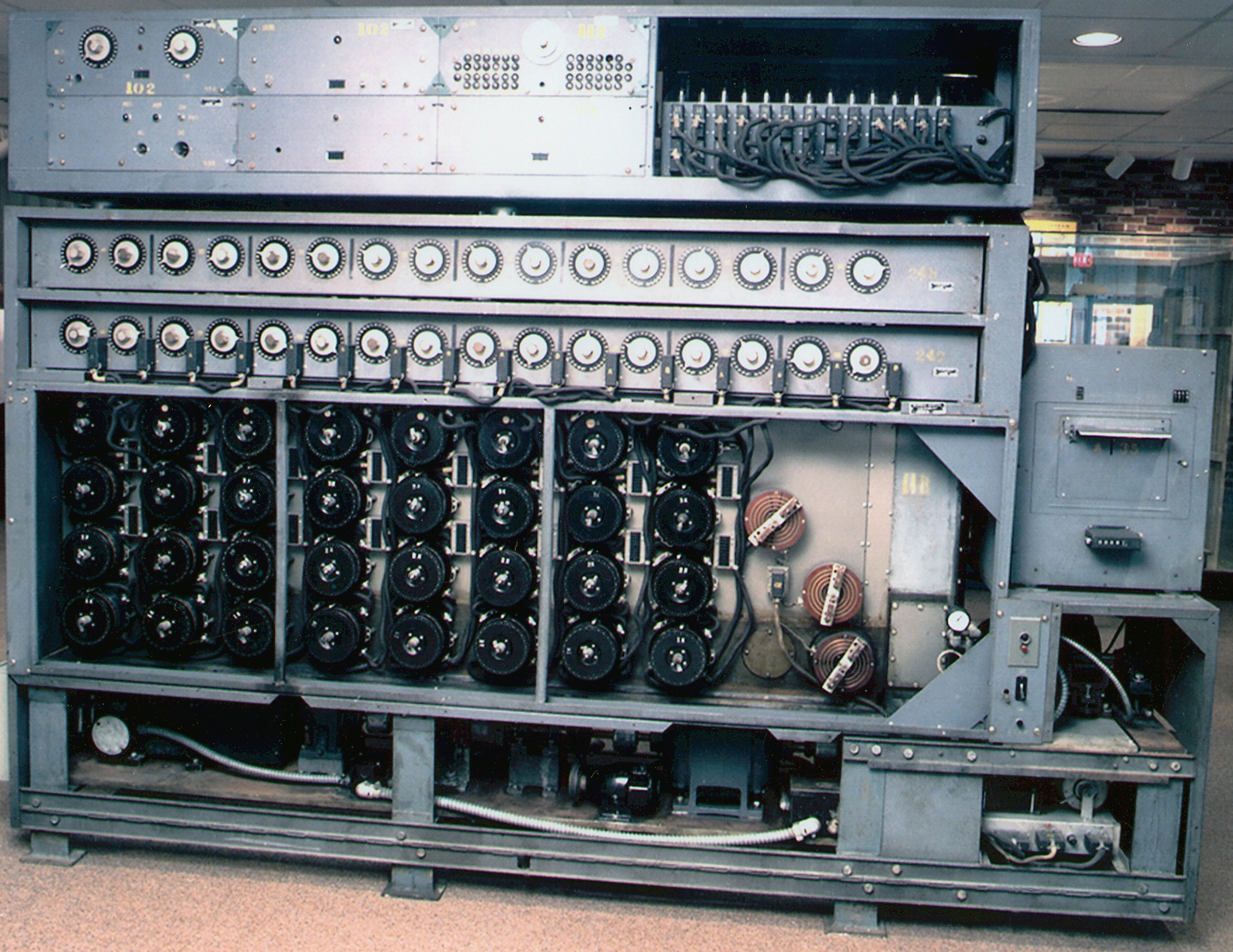
US Navy Bombe used to decrypt the German Enigma machine

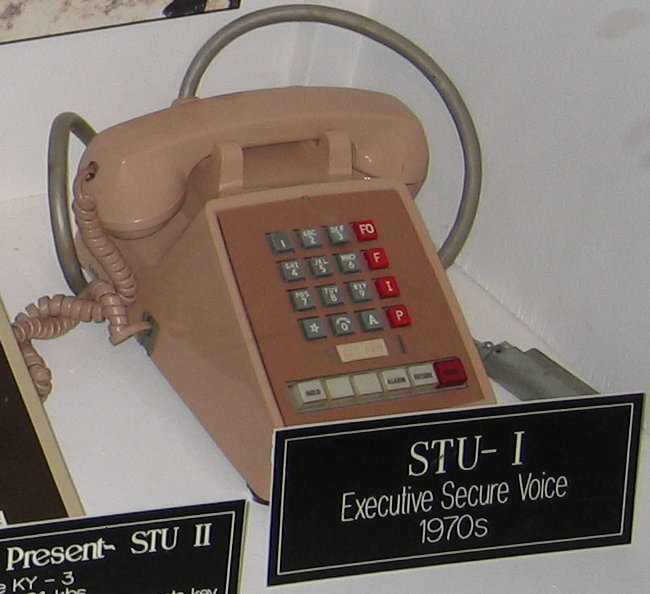
STU-I secure telephone desk set (electronics were housed in a separate cabinet)

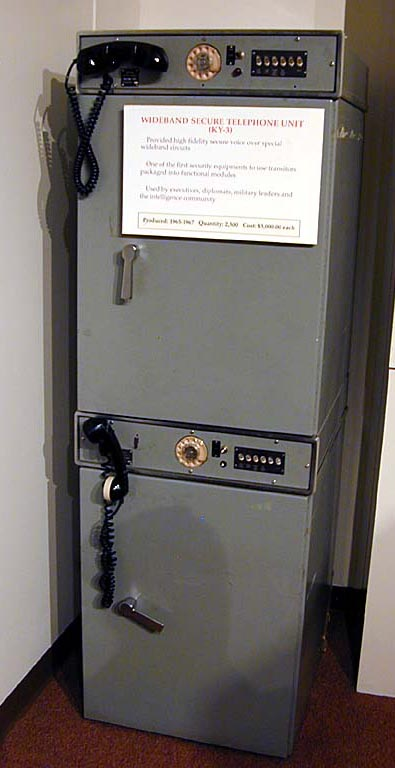
KY-3 secure telephone system

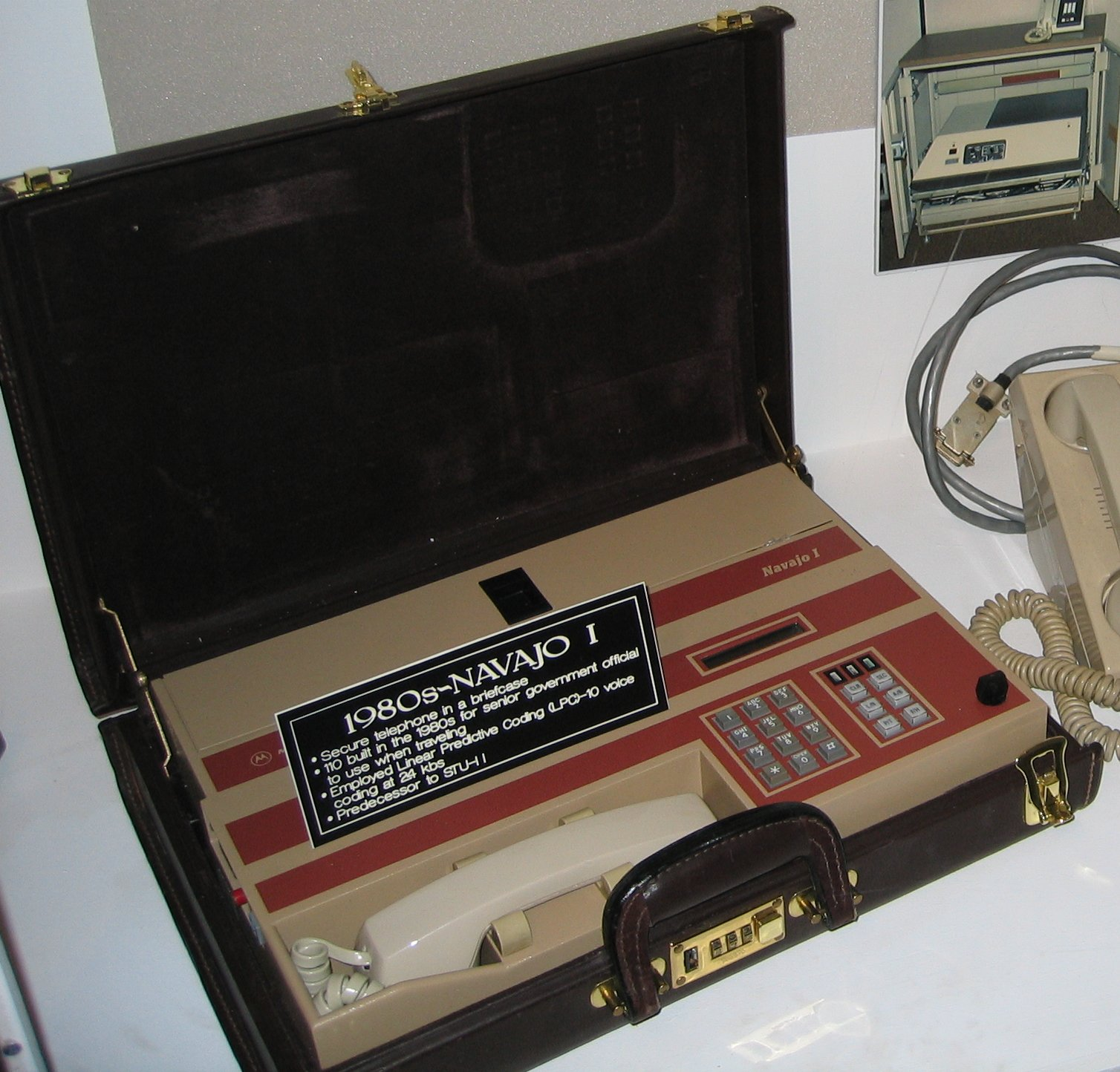
Navajo I secure telephone

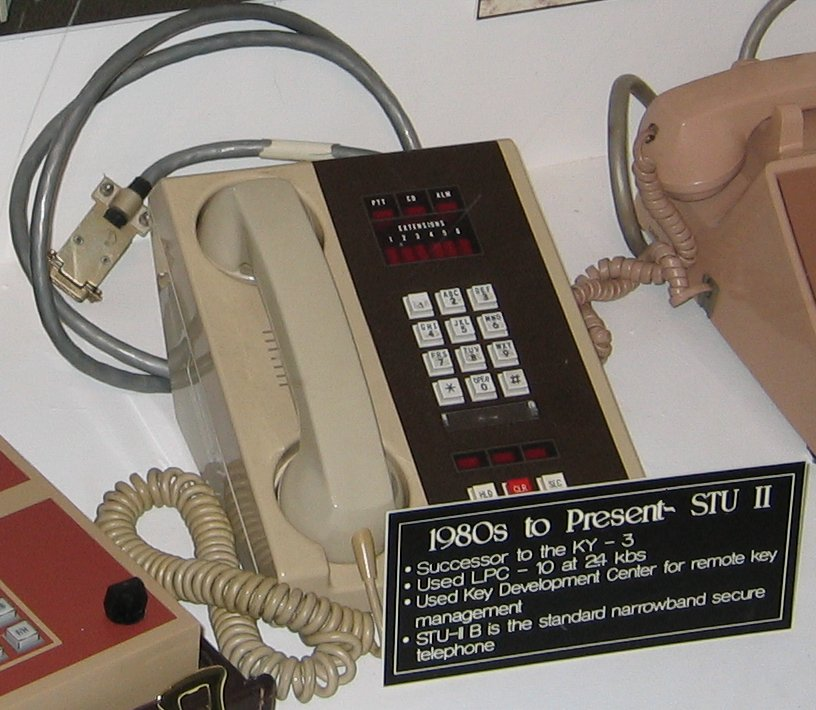
STU-II secure telephone desk set (electronics were housed in a separate cabinet)

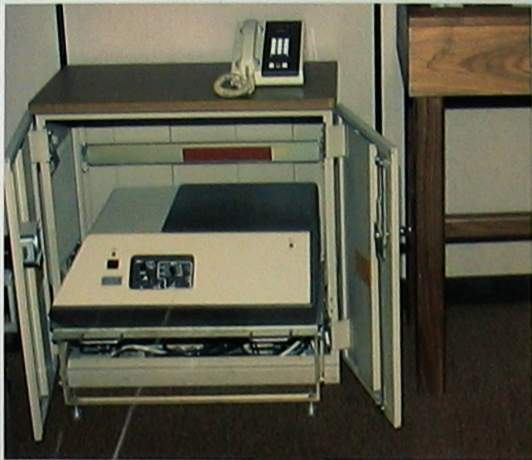
STU-II electronic equipment cabinet

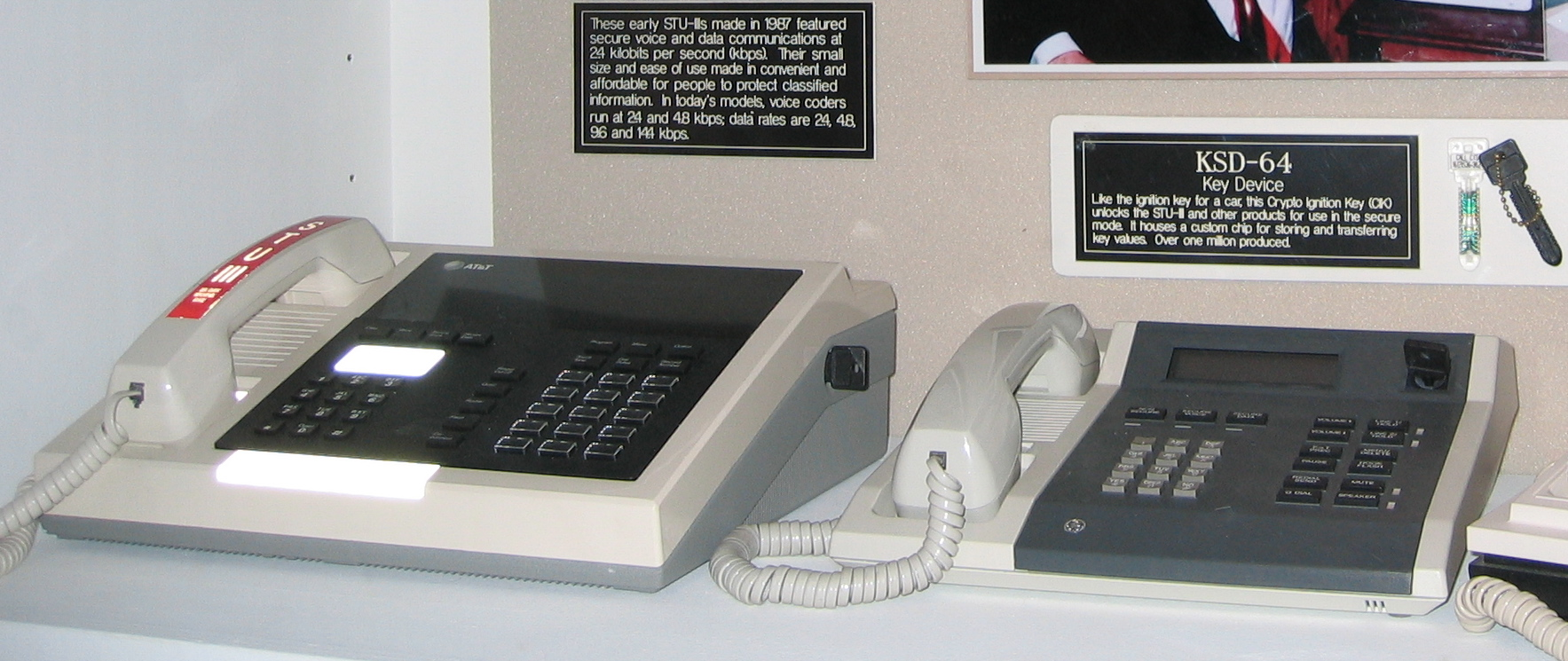
STU-III secure telephone desk set

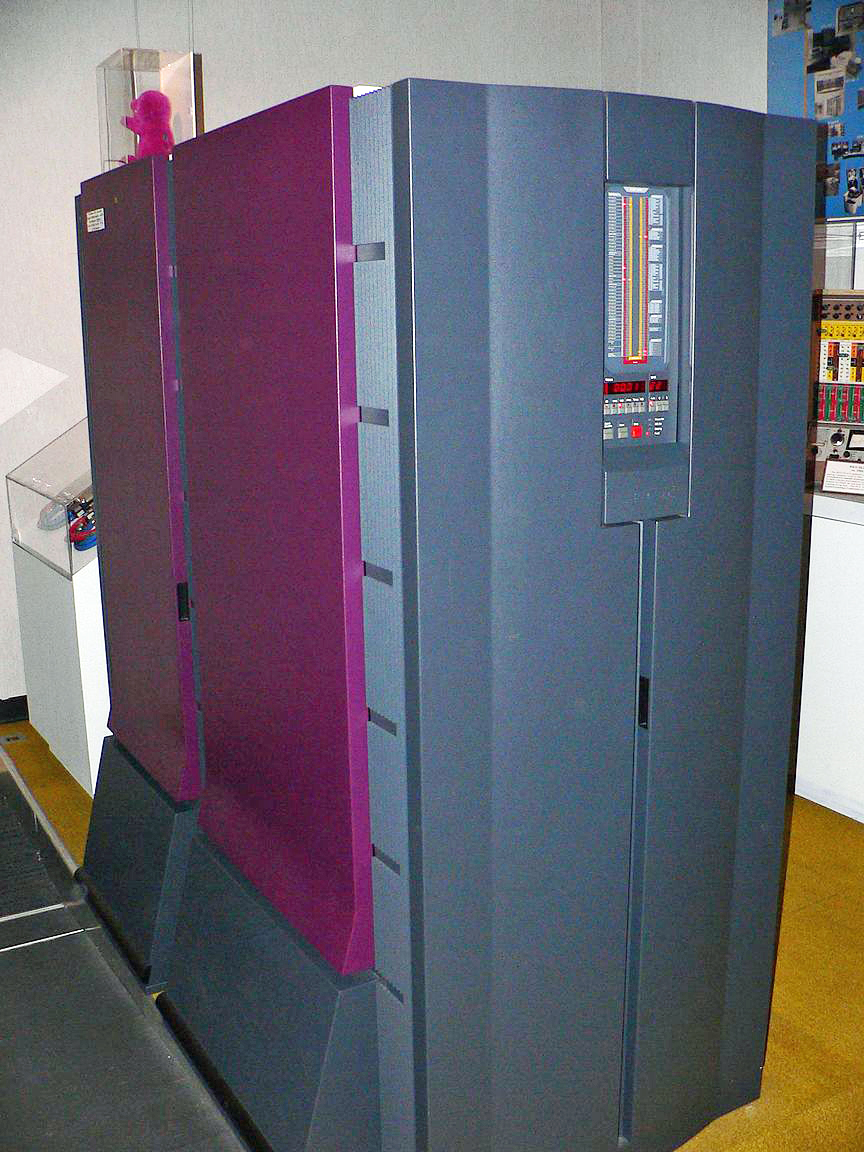
Cray Y-MP Ziegler NSA Supercomputer (1993)

== See also ==
- Arlington Hall
- Bletchley Park
- CIA Museum
- International Spy Museum
- H. Keith Melton
- Moscow–Washington hotline

== Sources ==
- Jack E. Ingram, "Ensuring the Legacy: The Story of the National Cryptologic Museum", Studies in Intelligence, 47(3), 2003
- Jack E. Ingram, "The National Cryptologic Museum: The First Ten Years – A Personal Story", Intelligencer 14(1) (Winter/Spring 2004), pp. 101–10.
- Louis Kruh, "A Pictorial Tour of the National Cryptologic Museum", 18(4), October 1994, pp. 381–89. doi:10.1080/0161-119491882955
