= STU-II =

Secure telephone

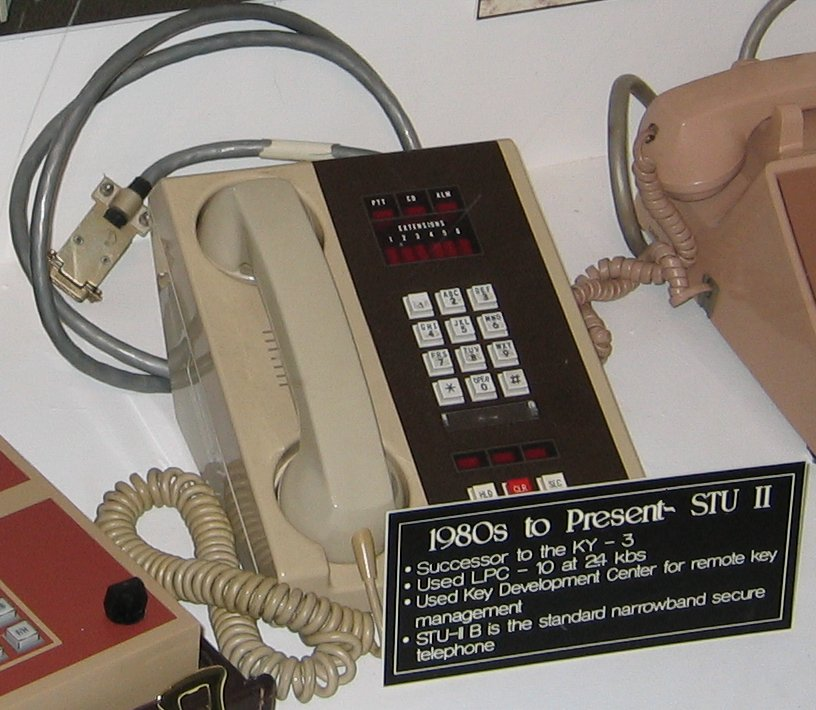
STU-II secure telephone desk set. Electronics were housed in a separate cabinet.

The STU-II (Standard Telephone Unit II) is a secure telephone developed by the U.S. National Security Agency. It permitted up to six users to have secure communications, on a time-shared (e.g.: rotating) basis. It was made by ITT Defense Communications, Nutley, New Jersey. An OEM partner was Northern Telecom.

According to information on display in 2005 at the NSA's National Cryptologic Museum, the STU-II was in use from the 1980s to the present. It uses the linear predictive coding algorithm LPC-10 at 2.4 kilobits/second to digitize voice, and the "Key Distribution Center" (KDC) for key management. The display also stated that the STU-II B is the standard narrow band secure telephone.

STU-II replaced the STU-I, KY-3 and the Navajo I. The last was a secure telephone in a briefcase, of which 110 were built in the 1980s for use by senior government officials when traveling. The Navaho I also used LPC-10.

Some 10 000 STU-II units were produced.

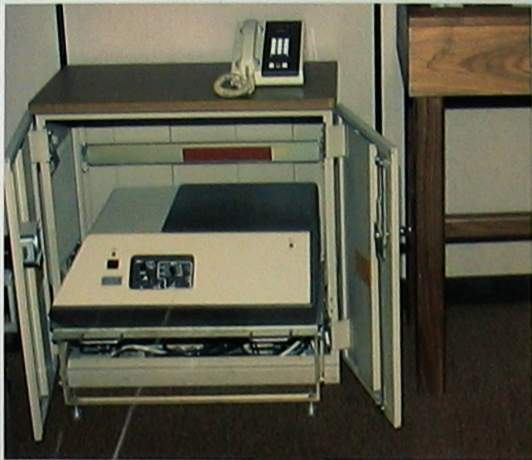
STU-II cabinet with desk set on top.

== See also ==
- STU-III
- SCIP
