= WLPC =

WLPC may refer to:

- WLPC-CD, a low-power television station (channel 28) licensed to serve Redford, Michigan, United States
- Warped Linear Predictive Coding, a signal processing method
