= Vince Houghton =

Museum curator at the National Security Agency

Vince Houghton is an American historian specializing in diplomatic and military history, with a focus on intelligence studies. He is the curator of the National Security Agency’s National Cryptologic Museum and formerly served as chief historian and curator of the International Spy Museum in Washington, D.C. Houghton earned his Ph.D. in diplomatic and military history from the University of Maryland, where his research examined American scientific and technological intelligence, particularly nuclear intelligence, during the Second World War and the early Cold War. He also holds a master’s degree from the University of Maryland, where he studied US–Soviet relations. He has taught at the middle school, high school, and university levels, most recently at the University of Maryland, where his courses included U.S. intelligence history, U.S. diplomatic history, the Cold War, and the history of science. Houghton is a veteran of the United States Army and served in the Balkans, where he worked with both civilian and military intelligence organizations.

== Books ==
- The Nuclear Spies
- Nuking the Moon
- Covert City
