= Code-excited linear prediction =

Speech coding algorithm

Code-excited linear prediction (CELP) is a linear predictive speech coding algorithm originally proposed by Manfred R. Schroeder and Bishnu S. Atal in 1985. At the time, it provided significantly better quality than existing low bit-rate algorithms, such as residual-excited linear prediction (RELP) and linear predictive coding (LPC) vocoders (e.g., FS-1015). Along with its variants, such as algebraic CELP, relaxed CELP, low-delay CELP and vector sum excited linear prediction, it is currently the most widely used speech coding algorithm. It is also used in MPEG-4 Audio speech coding. CELP is commonly used as a generic term for a class of algorithms and not for a particular codec.

== Background ==
The CELP algorithm is based on four main ideas:

- Using the source–filter model of speech production through linear prediction (LP) (see the textbook "speech coding algorithm");
- Using an adaptive and a fixed codebook as the input (excitation) of the LP model;
- Performing a search in closed-loop in a "perceptually weighted domain".
- Applying vector quantization (VQ)

The original algorithm as simulated in 1983 by Schroeder and Atal required 150 seconds to encode 1 second of speech when run on a Cray-1 supercomputer. Since then, more efficient ways of implementing the codebooks and improvements in computing capabilities have made it possible to run the algorithm in embedded devices, such as mobile phones.

== CELP decoder ==
Figure 1: CELP decoder

Before exploring the complex encoding process of CELP we introduce the decoder here. Figure 1 describes a generic CELP decoder. The excitation is produced by summing the contributions from fixed (a.k.a. stochastic or innovation) and adaptive (a.k.a. pitch) codebooks:

$$e[n]=e_f[n]+e_a[n]\,$$

where $e_{f}[n]$ is the fixed (a.k.a. stochastic or innovation) codebook contribution and $e_{a}[n]$ is the adaptive (pitch) codebook contribution. The fixed codebook is a vector quantization dictionary that is (implicitly or explicitly) hard-coded into the codec. This codebook can be algebraic (ACELP) or be stored explicitly (e.g. Speex). The entries in the adaptive codebook consist of delayed versions of the excitation. This makes it possible to efficiently code periodic signals, such as voiced sounds.

The filter that shapes the excitation has an all-pole model of the form $1/A(z)$, where $A(z)$ is called the prediction filter and is obtained using linear prediction (Levinson–Durbin algorithm). An all-pole filter is used because it is a good representation of the human vocal tract and because it is easy to compute.

== CELP encoder ==
The main principle behind CELP is called analysis-by-synthesis (AbS) and means that the encoding (analysis) is performed by perceptually optimizing the decoded (synthesis) signal in a closed loop. In theory, the best CELP stream would be produced by trying all possible bit combinations and selecting the one that produces the best-sounding decoded signal. This is obviously not possible in practice for two reasons: the required complexity is beyond any currently available hardware and the “best sounding” selection criterion implies a human listener.

In order to achieve real-time encoding using limited computing resources, the CELP search is broken down into smaller, more manageable, sequential searches using a simple perceptual weighting function. Typically, the encoding is performed in the following order:

- Linear prediction coefficients (LPC) are computed and quantized, usually as line spectral pairs (LSPs).
- The adaptive (pitch) codebook is searched and its contribution removed.
- The fixed (innovation) codebook is searched.

=== Noise weighting ===
Most (if not all) modern audio codecs attempt to shape the coding noise so that it appears mostly in the frequency regions where the ear cannot detect it. For example, the ear is more tolerant to noise in parts of the spectrum that are louder and vice versa. That's why instead of minimizing the simple quadratic error, CELP minimizes the error for the perceptually weighted domain. The weighting filter W(z) is typically derived from the LPC filter by the use of bandwidth expansion:

$$W(z) = \frac{A(z/\gamma_1)}{A(z/\gamma_2)}$$

where $\gamma_1 > \gamma_2$.

== See also ==
- MPEG-4 Part 3 (CELP as an MPEG-4 Audio Object Type)
- G.728 – Coding of speech at 16 kbit/s using low-delay code excited linear prediction
- G.718 – uses CELP for the lower two layers for the band (50–6400 Hz) in a two-stage coding structure
- G.729.1 – uses CELP coding for the lower band (50–4000 Hz) in a three-stage coding structure
- Comparison of audio coding formats
- CELT is a related audio codec that borrows some ideas from CELP.
