= G.728 =

ITU-T standard for speech coding

"G.728" (Bit-exact fixed point (1994)

Song

G.728 is an ITU-T standard for speech coding operating at 16 kbit/s. It is officially described as Coding of speech at 16 kbit/s using low-delay code excited linear prediction.

Technology used is LD-CELP, low-delay code excited linear prediction. Delay of the codec is only 5 samples (0.625 ms). The linear prediction is calculated backwards with a 50th order linear predictive coding filter. The excitation is generated with gain scaled VQ. The standard was finished in 1992 in the form of algorithm exact floating point code. In 1994 a bit exact fixed point codec was released. G.728 passes low bit rate modem signals up to 2400 bit/s. Also network signaling goes through. The complexity of the codec is 30 MIPS. 2 kilobytes of RAM is needed for codebooks. Mean opinion score for G.728 is 3.61.

The essence of CELP techniques, which is an analysis-by-synthesis approach to codebook search, is retained in LD-CELP. The LD-CELP however, uses backward adaptation of predictors and gain to achieve an algorithmic delay of 0.625 ms.

RealAudio 28.8 is a reduced-bitrate variant of this standard, using 15.2 kbit/s.

== See also ==
- List of codecs
- Comparison of audio coding formats
