= STU-I =

Secure telephone

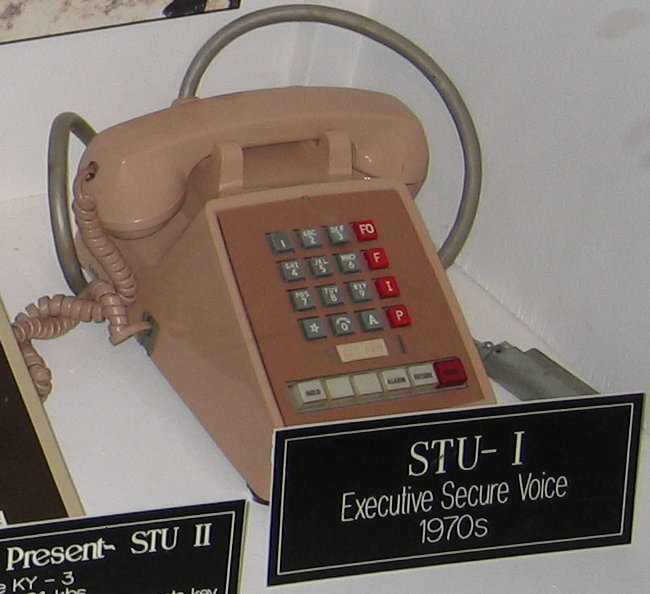
STU-I secure telephone desk set. Electronics were housed in a separate cabinet.

The STU-I, like its successors sometimes known as a "stew phone", was a secure telephone developed by the U.S. National Security Agency for use by senior U.S. government officials in the 1970s.

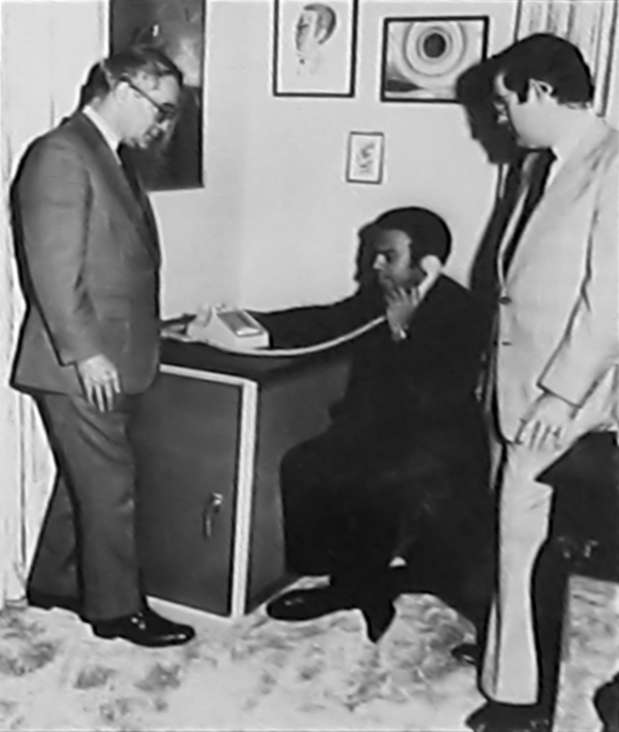
STU-I cabinet with desk set on top. The person talking is U.N. Ambassador Andrew Young, calling from New York City during the Israel-Egypt peace talks in the Carter administration.

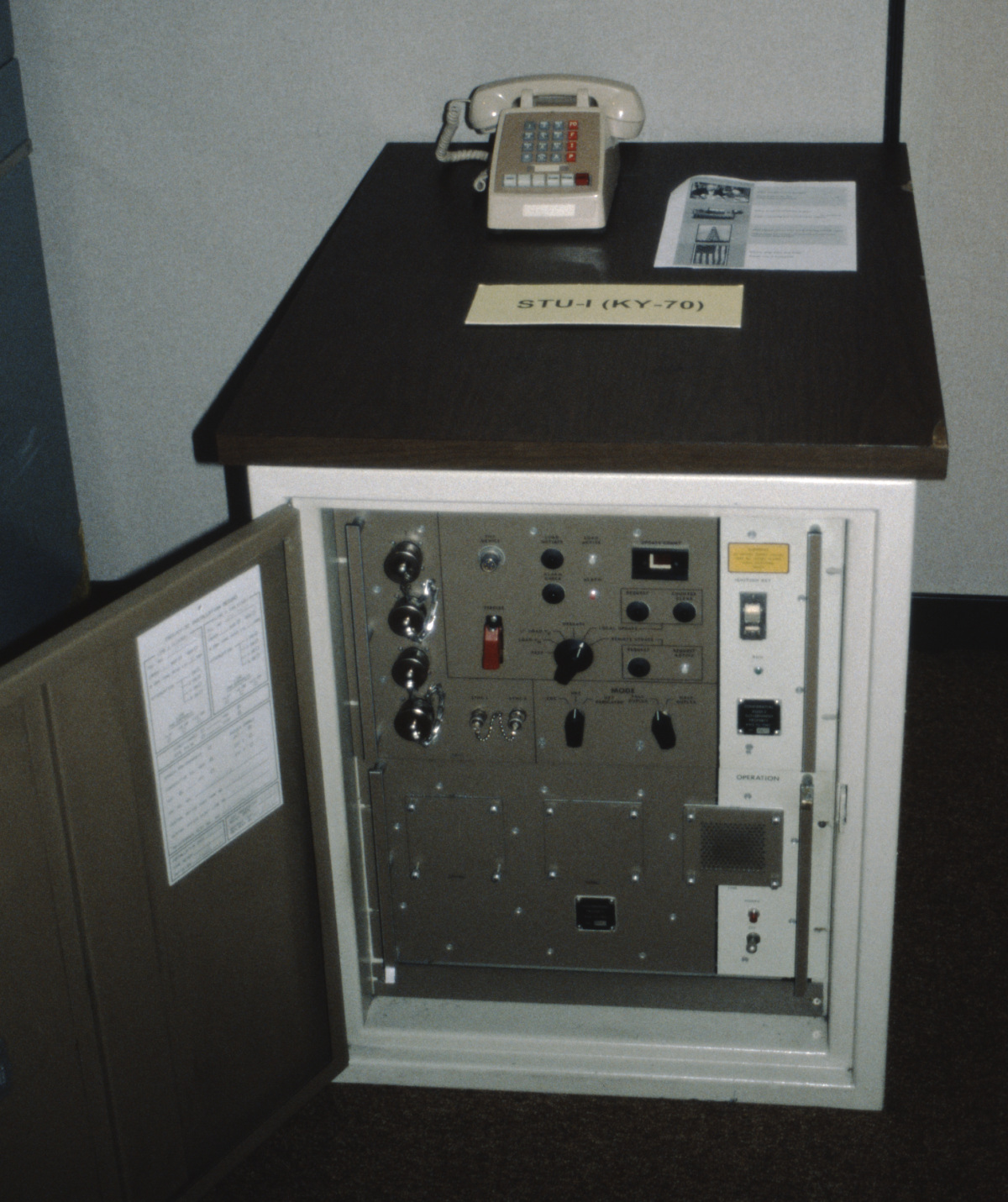
STU-I cabinet front door open.

== See also ==
- KY-3
- Navajo I
- STU-II
- STU-III
- SCIP
