= Linear predictive analysis =

Linear predictive analysis is a simple form of first-order extrapolation: if it has been changing at this rate then it will probably continue to change at approximately the same rate, at least in the short term. This is equivalent to fitting a tangent to the graph and extending the line.

One use of this is in linear predictive coding which can be used as a method of reducing the amount of data needed to approximately encode a series. Suppose it is desired to store or transmit a series of values representing voice. The value at each sampling point could be transmitted (if 256 values are possible then 8 bits of data for each point are required, if the precision of 65536 levels are desired then 16 bits per sample are required). If it is known that the value rarely changes more than +/- 15 values between successive samples (-15 to +15 is 31 steps, counting the zero) then we could encode the change in 5 bits. As long as the change is less than +/- 15 values in successive steps the value will exactly reproduce the desired sequence. When the rate of change exceeds +/-15 then the reconstructed values will temporarily differ from the desired value; provided fast changes that exceed the limit are rare it may be acceptable to use the approximation in order to attain the improved coding density.

== See also ==
- Linear prediction
