= Log area ratio =

Log area ratios (LAR) can be used to represent reflection coefficients (another form for linear prediction coefficients) for transmission over a channel. While not as efficient as line spectral pairs (LSPs), log area ratios are much simpler to compute. Let $r_k$ be the kth reflection coefficient of a filter, the kth LAR is:

$$A_k = \log{1-r_k \over 1+r_k}$$

Use of Log Area Ratios have now been mostly replaced by Line Spectral Pairs, but older codecs, such as GSM-FR use LARs.

== See also ==
- Line spectral pairs
