= Fumitada Itakura =

Japanese scientist

Fumitada Itakura (板倉 文忠, Itakura Fumitada; born 6 August 1940) is a Japanese scientist. He did pioneering work in statistical signal processing, and its application to speech analysis, synthesis and coding, including the development of the linear predictive coding (LPC) and line spectral pairs (LSP) methods.

== Biography ==
Itakura was born in Toyokawa, Aichi Prefecture, Japan. He received undergraduate and graduate degrees from Nagoya University in 1963 and 1965, respectively. In 1966, while studying his PhD at Nagoya, he developed the earliest concepts for what would later become known as linear predictive coding (LPC), along with Shuzo Saito from Nippon Telegraph and Telephone (NTT). They described an approach to automatic phoneme discrimination that involved the first maximum likelihood approach to speech coding. In 1968, he joined the NTT Musashino Electrical Communication Laboratory in Tokyo. The same year, Itakura and Saito presented the Itakura–Saito distance algorithm. The following year, Itakura and Saito introduced partial correlation (PARCOR) to LPC.

Itakura completed his D.Eng. degree in speech processing in 1972, writing his dissertation on "Speech Analysis and Synthesis based on a Statistical Method." From 1973 to 1975, he worked at the Acoustics Research Department of Bell Labs, having been invited to work there on fundamental problems by James Flanagan, who had been impressed by one of Itakura's papers on low bit-rate encoding.

In 1975, Itakura developed the line spectral pairs (LSP) method for high-compression speech coding, while at NTT. From 1975 to 1981, he studied problems in speech analysis and synthesis based on the LSP method. In 1980, his team developed an LSP-based speech synthesizer chip. LSP is an important technology for speech synthesis and coding, and in the 1990s was adopted by almost all international speech coding standards as an essential component, contributing to the enhancement of digital speech communication over mobile channels and the internet worldwide.

In 1981, he was appointed as Chief of the Speech and Acoustics Research Section at NTT. He left this position in 1984 to take a professorship in communications theory and signal processing at Nagoya University. He currently teaches at Meijo University.

Itakura's work on spectral and formant estimation laid the foundation for much of the early progress in speech signal processing. His work on autoregressive modeling of speech is used in nearly every modern low-to-medium, bit-rate speech transmission system, and the line spectral pair representation he developed is now found in nearly all cellular telephone systems.

== Awards ==
His awards include the IEEE ASSP 1975 Senior Award, an award from Japan's Ministry of Science and Technology in 1977, the IEEE 1986 Morris N. Liebmann Award (with B. S. Atal), the IEEE Signal Processing 1996 Society Award, the IEEE Third Millennium Medal, the IEICE 2002 Distinguished Achievement and Contributions Award, and the 2003 Purple Ribbon Medal from Japanese Government. In 2005, he received the Asahi Prize and the IEEE Jack S. Kilby Signal Processing Medal. In 2009, he received the NEC C&C Prize for his pioneering research and the development of highly efficient voice-coding technology with analysis-synthesis methods for speech. He is a Fellow of the IEEE for pioneering contributions to speech processing, and an honorary member the Institute of Electronics, Information and Communication Engineers of Japan.
