= Residual-excited linear prediction =

Residual-excited linear prediction (RELP) is an obsolete speech coding algorithm. It was originally proposed in the 1970s and can be seen as an ancestor of code-excited linear prediction (CELP). Unlike CELP however, RELP directly transmits the residual signal. To achieve lower rates, that residual signal is usually down-sampled (e.g. to 1–2 kHz). The algorithm is hardly used anymore in audio transmission.

It is still used in some text-to-speech voices, such as the diphone databases found in the Festival and Flite speech synthesizers.
