= KY-3 =

Secure telephone system

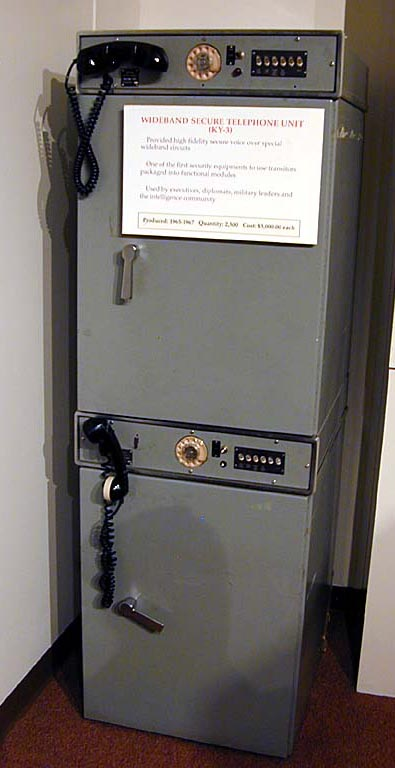
Two stacked KY-3s at the NSA's National Cryptologic Museum

The KY-3 (TSEC/KY-3) is a secure telephone system developed by the U.S. National Security Agency in the early 1960s. It was one of the first widely accepted voice encryption systems. The "TSEC" prefix to the model number indicates NSA's Telecommunications Security nomenclature system.

It was made by the Bendix Corporation according to specifications of the NSA. According to information on display in 2002 at the NSA's National Cryptologic Museum, the KY-3 provided high fidelity secure voice over special wide-band circuits known as "4-wire dedicated drops", since it used pulse-code modulation encoding for the audio which gave it "high-quality speech". Its overall high power requirements and physical size limited its "tactical" use but gained popularity among executives, diplomats, military leaders and the intelligence community. More than 2,500 units were produced between 1965 and 1967 and it was one of the first telecommunication security devices to use transistors packaged into functional modules. The unit was packaged in a grey relay rack cabinet. The KY-3 was replaced by the STU-I and STU-II and remained in use until the late 1980s.

== See also ==
- STU-III
- Secure Terminal Equipment
- SCIP
