= James L. Flanagan =

American electrical engineer (1926–2012

- Born: August 26, 1925; Greenwood, Mississippi
- Died: August 25, 2015 (aged 89); Warren Township, New Jersey
- Awards: ASA Gold Medal (1986); IEEE Edison Medal (1986); Marconi Prize (1992); National Medal of Science (1996); IEEE Medal of Honor (2005)
- Scientific career
- Fields: Electrical engineering

James Loton Flanagan (August 26, 1925 – August 25, 2015) was an American electrical engineer. He was Rutgers University's vice president for research until 2004. He was also director of Rutgers' Center for Advanced Information Processing and the Board of Governors Professor of Electrical and Computer Engineering. He is known for co-developing adaptive differential pulse-code modulation (ADPCM) with P. Cummiskey and Nikil Jayant at Bell Labs.

== Biography ==
Flanagan was born in Greenwood, Mississippi. He received a bachelor's degree in Electrical Engineering in 1948 at Mississippi State University. Afterwards, he started as a graduate student in the Acoustics Laboratory at MIT where he got his master's degree in 1950 and, after a two-year break teaching at Mississippi State, received his Ph.D. in 1955.

He was chosen as the 2005 recipient of the Research and Development Council of New Jersey's Science/Technology Medal. He worked at Bell Laboratories for 33 years before he joined Rutgers. He has worked in voice communications, computer techniques, and electroacoustic systems. At Bell Laboratories he was the department head of the Acoustics Research Department for many years, and managed and supported work such as James E. West's invention of the electret microphone, Bishnu S. Atal's work on speech coding, David Berkley and Gary Elko's work on acoustics, Jont Allen and Joe Hall's work on psychoacoustics, James D. Johnston's work on perceptual audio coding mp3, work on speech synthesis, and Lawrence Rabiner and Aaron Rosenberg (and others) work on speech recognition. Flanagan holds the patent on the modern artificial larynx design. During his tenure, first as department head, and then Laboratory Director, many advancements in signal processing, psychoacoustics, array microphone processing, digital loudspeakers, and other pioneering achievements were reduced to practice.

Flanagan has been a resident of Warren Township, New Jersey. He died on August 25, 2015.

== Awards and honors ==
- National Medal of Science;
- L.M. Ericsson International Prize in Telecommunications;
- Doctor Honoris Causa by the Universidad Politécnica de Madrid, October 1992.
- The IEEE James L. Flanagan Speech and Audio Processing award was established in 2002.
- IEEE Medal of Honor in 2005;
- Edison Medal in 1986 of the Institute of Electrical and Electronics Engineers (IEEE);
- Medal of the European Speech Communication Association;
- Gold Medal of the Acoustical Society of America;
- Marconi International Fellowship.

He is the author of more than 200 papers and two books, and holds 50 patents. He is a member of the National Academy of Sciences and the National Academy of Engineering.
