= Navajo I =

Secure telephone

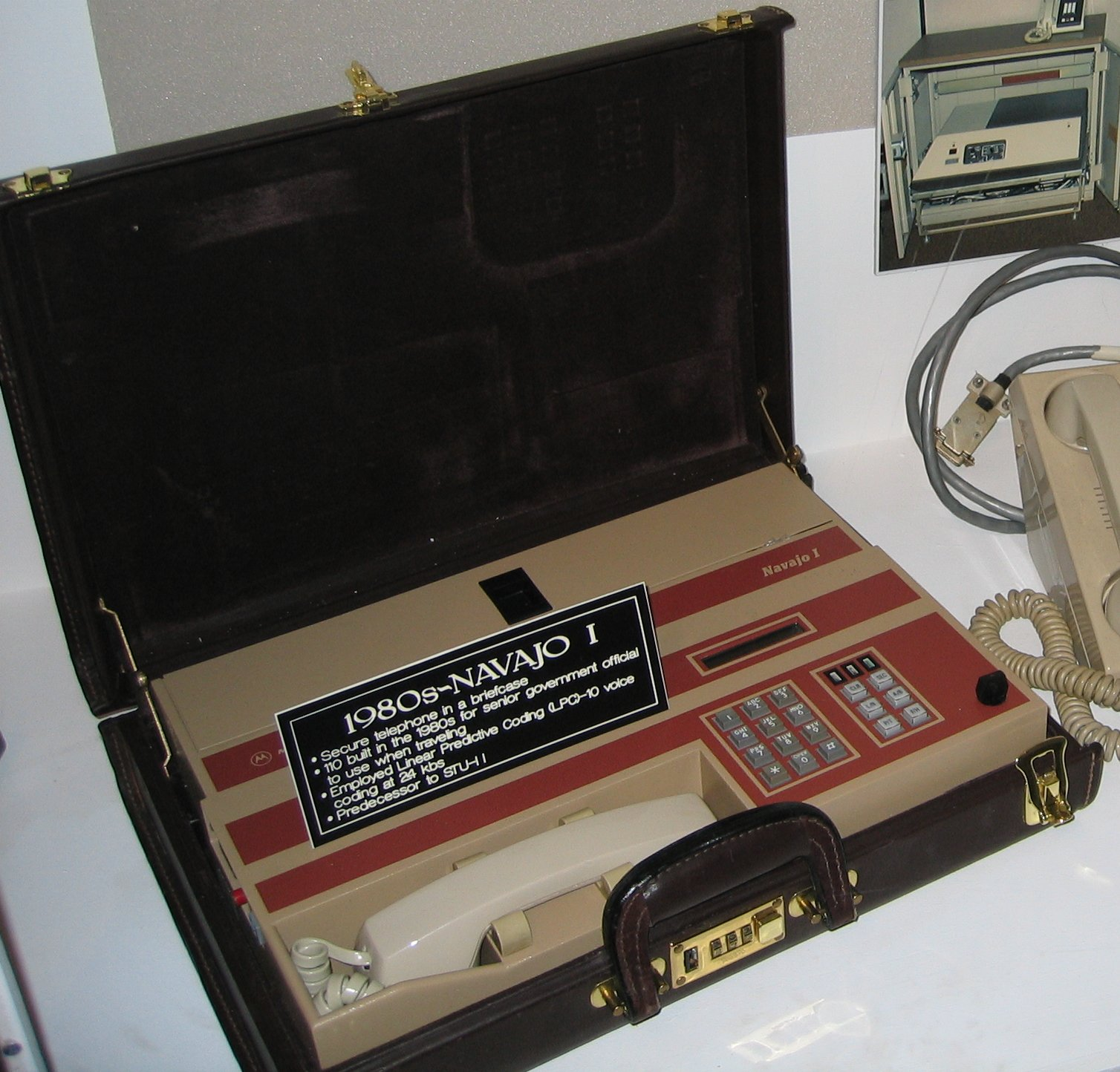
Navajo I secure telephone

The Navajo I is a secure telephone built into a briefcase that was developed by the U.S. National Security Agency. According to information on display in 2002 at the NSA's National Cryptologic Museum, 110 units were built in the 1980s for use by senior government officials when traveling. It uses the linear predictive coding algorithm LPC-10 at 2.4 kilobits/second.

The name is most likely a reference to the Navajo code talkers of World War II.

== Sources ==
Display labels from .

== See also ==
- STU-II
- SCIP
