= Relaxed code-excited linear prediction =

Audio codec standard

Relaxed code-excited linear prediction (RCELP) is a method used in some advanced speech codecs. The RCELP algorithm does not attempt to match the original signal exactly. Instead, it matches a time-warped version of this original signal that conforms to a simplified pitch contour.
