= Nikil Jayant =

Indian-American communications engineer

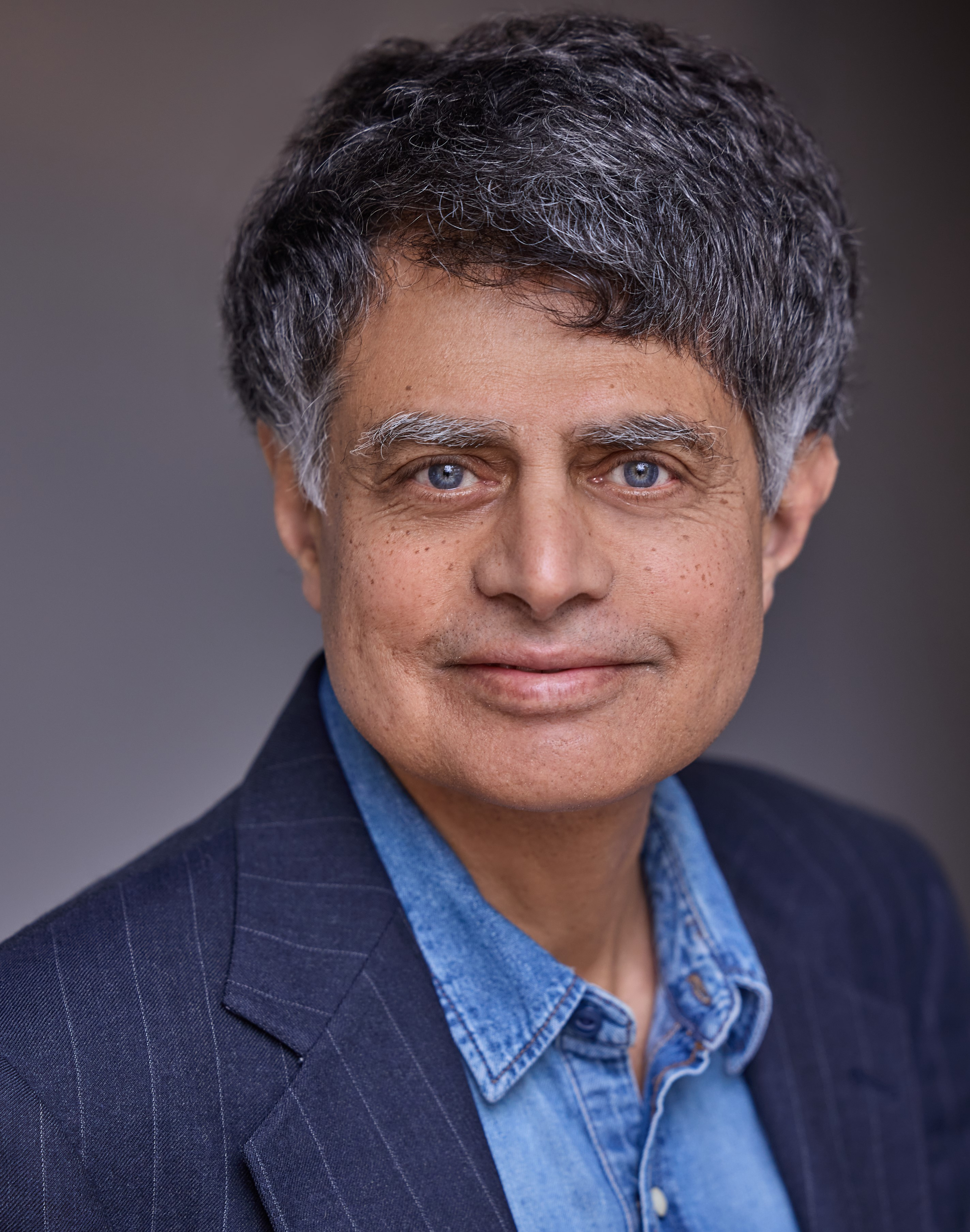
Nikil Jayant (May 2023)

Dr. Nikil Jayant is an Indian-American engineer.

He obtained his PhD in Electrical Communication engineering from the Indian Institute of Science in Bangalore, India. Jayant is Emeritus Chaired Professor at Georgia Institute of Technology where he served as a Georgia Research Alliance Eminent Scholar and as the Executive Director of the Georgia Centers for Advanced Telecommunication Technology. He has also served as an adjunct professor with the University of California at Santa Barbara.

Prior to his nearly 20-year career in academia, he worked at Bell Laboratories for 30 years, as an individual researcher in the Acoustics Research Department and as the founding director of three research organizations in the areas of audiovisual signal processing and digital communications. Contributions from these organizations are reflected in international ITU and ISO-MPEG standards for speech and multimedia communications, and in US standards for cellular telephony, HDTV and Digital Audio Radio.

While at Georgia Tech, he co-founded two video communications companies for advancing elastic compression and automatic quality assessment. His research at Georgia Tech also included partnerships with Emory University in digital pathology and informatics. His recent focus at UCSB was on an information-rigorous architecture for collective human-computer intelligence.

Jayant is the author of 180 papers, 36 patents and 5 books. He is the winner of two IEEE prize paper awards, the Lucent patent recognition award, and a recipient of the IEEE Third Millennium medal. He has been inducted into the New Jersey Inventors Hall of Fame and named a Distinguished Alumnus of the Indian Institute of Science. He is a Fellow of the IEEE, Fellow of the National Academy of Inventors, and a member of the National Academy of Engineering. Jayant served as the Chair of a National Academies study that resulted in a policy-influencing report by the National Research Council, "Broadband: Bringing Home the Bits".
