= Manfred R. Schroeder =

German physicist

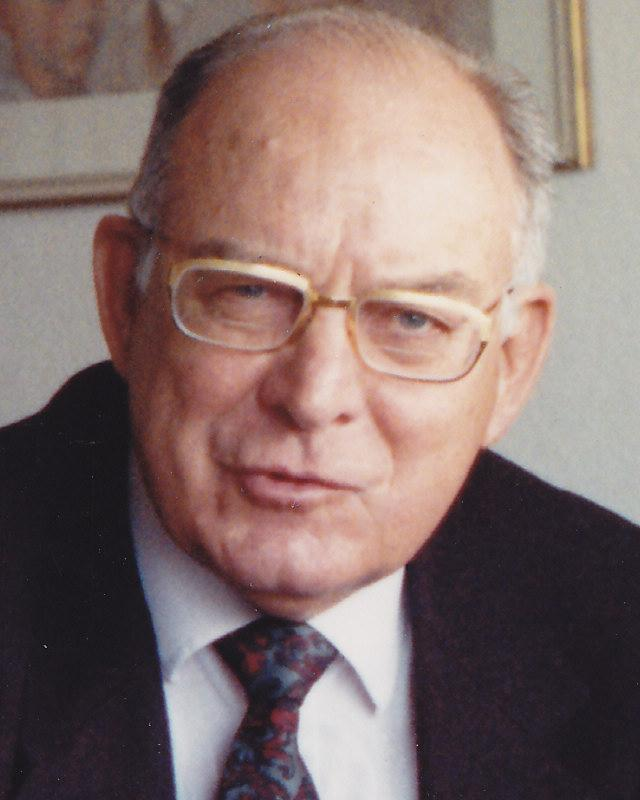
Manfred Schroeder (1993)

Manfred Robert Schroeder (12 July 1926 – 28 December 2009) was a German physicist, most known for his contributions to acoustics and computer graphics. He wrote three books and published over 150 articles in his field.

Born in Ahlen, he studied at the University of Göttingen (1947–52), earning a vordiplom in mathematics (1951) and Dr. rer. nat. (1954) in physics. His thesis showed how small regular cavities in concert halls cause unfortunate resonances.

He joined the technical staff at Bell Labs in New Jersey (1954–) researching speech and graphics, securing forty-five patents. With Bishnu Atal, he advanced and promoted linear predictive coding (LPC) during the late 1960s to 1970s and then developed code-excited linear prediction (CELP) in 1985. Still affiliated with Bell, he rejoined University of Göttingen as Universitätsprofessor Physik (1969) becoming professor emeritus (1991). He was a visiting professor at University of Tokyo (1979).

With Ning Xiang he was a promoter of a synchronous dual channel measurement method using reciprocal maximum-length sequences (2003). He led a famed study of 22 concert halls worldwide, leading to a comparison method requiring no travel.

== Books ==
- Schroeder, M. R. (2009). Number theory in science and communication : with applications in cryptography, physics, digital information, computing, and self-similarity. Berlin: Springer-Verlag. ISBN 978-3-540-85297-1. OCLC 310352248.
- Schroeder, M. R. (1991). Fractals, chaos, power laws : minutes from an infinite paradise. New York: W. H. Freeman. ISBN 978-0-7167-2136-9. OCLC 21522909.
- Schroeder, Manfred (1999). Computer Speech : Recognition, Compression, Synthesis. Berlin, Heidelberg: Springer Berlin Heidelberg Imprint Springer. ISBN 978-3-662-03861-1. OCLC 859587894.
- Hundert Jahre Friedrich Hund: Ein Rückblick auf das Wirken eines bedeutenden Physikers (1996)

== Awards and honors ==
- 1969 First Prize at the International Computer Art Competition for his application of concepts from mathematics and physics to the creation of artistic works.
- fellow of the Acoustical Society of America
- IEEE Fellow (1971).
- Audio Engineering Society fellow and Gold medalist (1972)
- Member of the United States National Academy of Engineering (1979), for "founding the statistical theory of wave propagation in multi-mode media and contributions to speech coding and acoustics".
- Fellow of the American Academy of Arts and Sciences (1986).
- Helmholtz Medal of the German Acoustical Society
- 1975 Max Planck Society appointed foreign scientific member
- New York Academy of Sciences member 1978
- Rayleigh Medal 1987
- Gold Medal from the Acoustical Society of America (1991), for "theoretical and practical contributions to human communication through innovative application of mathematics to speech, hearing, and concert hall acoustics".
- ISCA Medal for Scientific Achievement from the International Speech Communication Association (2004).
- Technology Award from the German Eduard Rhein Foundation (2004).
