= Bishnu S. Atal =

American engineer (1933–2026)

- Born: Bishnu Saroop Atal; 10 May 1933; Kanpur, United Provinces of Agra and Oudh, British India
- Died: 19 August 2026 (aged 93)
- Education: Brooklyn Polytechnic Institute; Indian Institute of Science; University of Lucknow
- Awards: Benjamin Franklin Medal (2003); IEEE ASSP Society Award (1993); IEEE Morris N. Liebmann Memorial Award (1986)

Bishnu Saroop Atal (10 May 1933 – 19 August 2026) was an Indian physicist and engineer. He was a noted researcher in acoustics, and was best known for developments in speech coding. Atal advanced linear predictive coding (LPC) during the late 1960s to 1970s, and developed code-excited linear prediction (CELP) with Manfred R. Schroeder in 1985.

In 1987, Atal was elected as a member into the National Academy of Engineering for innovative research in the area of linear predictive coding of speech.

== Life and career ==
Atal was born in Kanpur, United Provinces of Agra and Oudh, British India on 10 May 1933. He received his BS degree in physics (1952) from the University of Lucknow, a diploma in electrical communication engineering (1955) from the Indian Institute of Science, Bangalore and a PhD in electrical engineering (1968) from Brooklyn Polytechnic Institute.

From 1957 to 1960, he was a lecturer in acoustics at the Department of Electrical Communication Engineering, Indian Institute of Science, Bangalore.

In 1961 Atal joined Bell Laboratories, where his subsequent research focused on acoustics and speech, making major contributions in the field of speech analysis, synthesis, and coding, including low bit-rate speech coding and automatic speech recognition. He advanced and promoted linear predictive coding (1967), and developed code-excited linear prediction (1985) with Manfred R. Schroeder.

He retired in 2002 to become affiliate professor of Electrical Engineering at the University of Washington.

Atal held more than 16 U.S. patents, and was a member of the National Academy of Engineering and National Academy of Sciences, and a fellow of the Acoustical Society of America and of the Institute of Electrical and Electronics Engineers. He received the 1986 IEEE Morris N. Liebmann Memorial Award "for pioneering contributions to linear predictive coding for speech processing", and the 1993 IEEE ASSP Society Award for contributions to linear prediction of speech, multipulse, and code-excited source coding. He was the Franklin Institute's 2003 Benjamin Franklin Medal Laureate in Engineering.

Atal died on 19 August 2026, at the age of 93.

== Selected works ==
- US Patent 4,472,832: Digital speech coder

== Sources ==
- New Jersey Inventors of the Year
- IEEE Signal Processing Society Speech Technical Committee (STC) newsletter
- Voice Communication Between Humans and Machines
