= CU-SeeMe =

Internet videoconferencing client

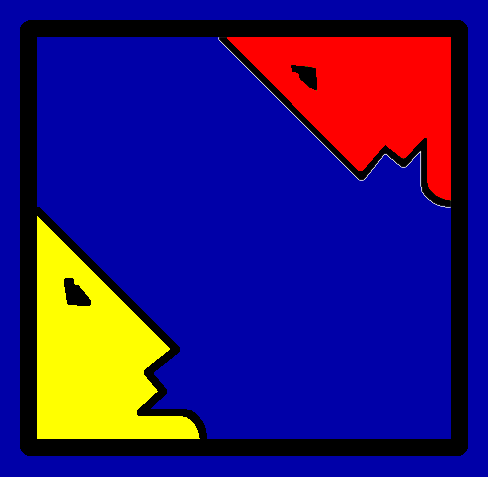
- Developer: Cornell University
- Release: 1995
- Final release: 3.1.2 (1998) / December 30, 1998
- Operating system: Windows 3.1 and later, Mac OS 7 and later
- Standard: G.723.1
- Type: Videotelephony

CU-SeeMe was an Internet video chat tool primarily used in the 1990s and early 2000s. CU-SeeMe allowed users to make point to point video calls, and eventually multi-point calls via a server, called "reflector" (later called a "conference server"). The application was a popular choice for schools and colleges experimenting with early videotelephony. The software was one of the first shareware applications to allow for video conferencing between devices without specialized hardware (beyond webcam, which were not common at the time).

== History ==
Global Schoolhouse students communicating via CU-SeeMe

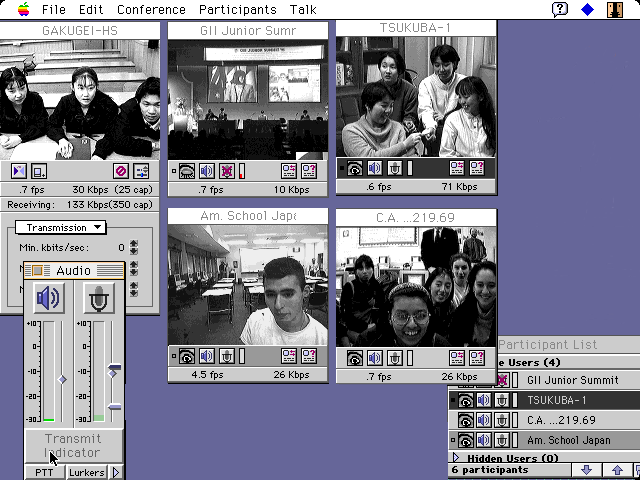
Screen capture showing Global Schoolhouse classrooms collaborating via CU-SeeMe

CU-SeeMe was originally developed by Tim Dorcey of the Information Technology department at Cornell University. The program was picked up by the nonprofit New York State Educational Research Network (NYSERNET) and was introduced to the public in April of 1993, as part of an NSF funded education project called the Global Schoolhouse to allow school children from multiple countries to communicate with each other.

CU-SeeMe 2.x was released as a shareware product in 1995 through an agreement with Cornell University. The full commercial licensing rights were transferred to White Pine Software in 1998.

It was first developed for the Macintosh, and exported to Windows 3.1 in 1994. Originally the application was video-only but audio was quickly added in 1994 for the Macintosh (System 7+) and August of 1995 for Windows 95. CU-SeeMe's audio came from Maven, an audio-only client developed at the University of Illinois at Urbana-Champaign. CU-SeeMe offered 24-bit color or 4-bit grayscale (320x240) video modes, private voice chat during group calls, simultaneous text chat, and the ability to view up to twelve (originally eight) video participants (of a theoretically unlimited number) at once. It was supported by Windows 3.1, Windows 95 and Windows NT. Later commercial versions of CU-SeeMe could also make point-to-point or multi-point calls to other vendor's teleconferencing software like Intel Video Phone and Net Meeting using the H.323 standard via a compatible DLS server using the G.723.1 codec.

== Notable Use Cases ==
In 1994 WXYC utilized CU-SeeMe to simulcast its signal to the net and so became the world's first internet radio station.

On June 20, 1995, now defunct London cable channel Channel One used CU-SeeMe to simulcast its programme Digital World live on the internet, becoming the first UK television programme to do so. The video was frame-grabbed every 2 frames using a macro written in Windows by duo Thibault & Rav.

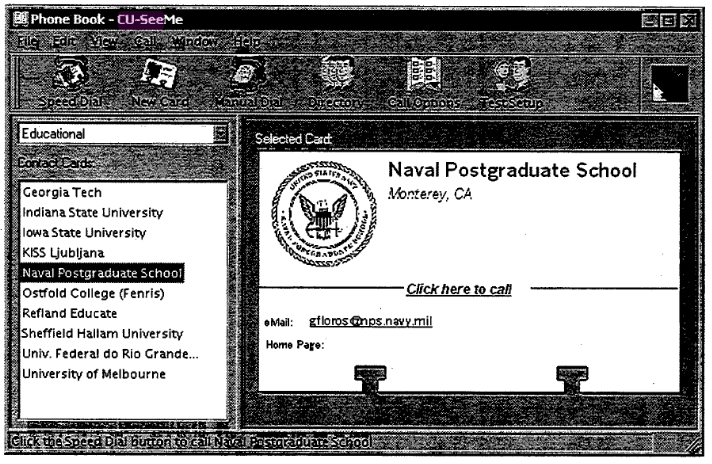
The directory page of the Windows version of CU-SeeMe

The US Air Force reported using CU-SeeMe to allow sailors attached to the Antarctic Development Squadron Six and U.S. Naval Support Force in Antarctica at McMurdo Station to communicate with their families living at the Naval Air Weapons Station Point in Mugu, CA over the 1995 Christmas season.

On Thanksgiving morning in 1995, World News Now was the first television program in the US to be broadcast live on the Internet, using a CU-SeeMe interface. Victor Dorff, a producer of WNN at the time, arranged to have the show simulcast on the Internet daily for a six-month trial period. CU-SeeMe was also used in a taped interview segment in which anchor Kevin Newman and Global Schoolhouse director and founder Dr. Yvonne Marie Andres discussed the future of computers in communication.

In March 1996, CU-SeeMe was used for the first ever live internet broadcast of a musical theatre performance with the production of Cowboys in Love: The Hank Plowplucker Story. The show was produced by The Ethereal Mutt, and the stream was a partnership between Emutt and the CIS staff at Arizona State University.

The Internet Phone Connection, written by Cheryl L. Kirk was one of the first consumer books to feature CU-SeeMe. The book outlined how to use the program to communicate across the globe.

The United States military including the US Air Force, US Navy and NASA used the software.

The following organizations operated "reflector" or conference servers between 1995 and 1999:

- Cornell University
- GTE
- Ulster University
- NASA Select USA
- NASA Select Europe
- NYSERNet
- Østfold University College
- Pennsylvania State University
- Indiana State University
- University of Kansas
- Michigan State University
- Murdoch University
- University of North Carolina
- Ohio State University
- University of Pennsylvania
- University of São Paulo
- Singapore University
- University of Texas at Austin
- Weizmann Institute of Science
- Georgia Tech
- University of Vaasa.

== Decline and acquisition ==
Early wide acceptance of CU-SeeMe outside of the hobbyist market was limited by its relatively poor audio/video quality and excessive latency from low-bandwidth connections over dial-up, although organizations with ISDN and T1 lines fared better. Frame rates were limited to about 1 - 7 frames per second and the programs "whiteboard" feature would occasionally crash the reflector/server application. While the commercial and freeware products were useful to hobbyists, CU-SeeMe and its accompanying server product were beginning to build a following in education.

A spinoff application from White Pines called ClassPoint was released commercially in 1998. It was an early attempt to add features to a real-time collaboration product specifically designed for K-12 education users.

White Pine locked out users of version 1.0 from using its free, public videoconferencing chatrooms. As users upgraded to the commercially available version, some were frustrated to discover that others were downloading the trial version and using software registration keys readily supplied by some participants on White Pine's public chatrooms.

A small but active community of users continued to use CU-SeeMe into the 2000s. The service declined in popularity with educators, but continued to be used by casual computer users, including with LGBT groups. The final versions posted to the White Pine website was for v3.1.2 for Windows 95 and 98 and NT 4.0 on November 12, 1998, and for Mac OS 7 on December 30, 1998.

=== Acquisition ===
White Pine Software was briefly renamed CUseeMe Networks, then merged with First Virtual Communications. The commercial standalone client was decommissioned, and an independent company used a version of the embedded commercial CU-SeeMe client renamed "CU" as part of a fee-based video chat service called CUworld. The commercial client and server environment were developed further and were renamed "Click To Meet" and launched along with an enhanced and more scalable version of the software MCU.

On March 15, 2005, Radvision Ltd. acquired all of the substantial assets and intellectual property of First Virtual Communications, including its 'Click to Meet' (formerly CUSeeMe) and Conference Server. Radvision was acquired by Avaya in June 2012. Spirent Communications acquired Radvision's Technology Business Unit from Avaya in July 2014. The descendants of the CU-SeeMe technology live on in part in the Radvision Scopia product line.

== See also ==
- Trojan Room coffee pot
