= Ekiga =

Voice and video conferencing software

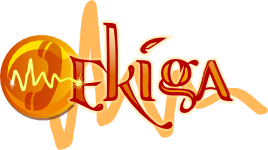

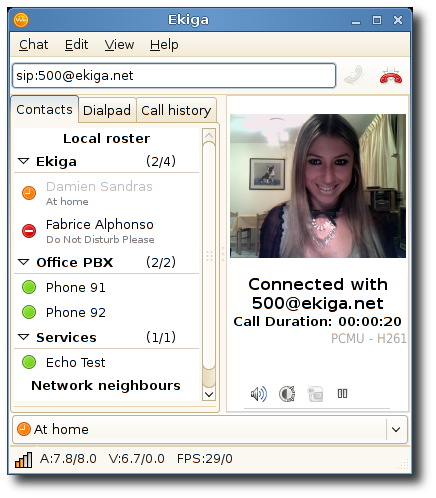
- Ekiga 3.0.0
- Developer(s): Damien Sandras
- Stable release: 4.0.1 / 21 February 2013
- Preview release: n/a (n/a) [±]
- Repository: gitlab.gnome.org/Archive/ekiga
- Written in: C/C++, with GUI written in C
- Platform: Unix-like, Microsoft Windows
- Type: VoIP, video conferencing
- License: GPL-2.0-or-later
- Website: ekiga.org

Ekiga (formerly called GnomeMeeting) was a VoIP and video conferencing application for GNOME and Microsoft Windows. It was distributed as free software under the terms of the GNU GPL-2.0-or-later. It was the default VoIP client in Ubuntu until October 2009, when it was replaced by Empathy. Ekiga supports both the SIP and H.323 (based on OPAL) protocols and is fully interoperable with any other SIP compliant application and with Microsoft NetMeeting. It supports many high-quality audio and video codecs.

Ekiga was initially written by Damien Sandras in order to graduate from the University of Louvain (UCLouvain), and was further developed and maintained by a community-based team led by Sandras. The logo was designed based on his concept by Andreas Kwiatkowski.

Ekiga.net was also a free and private SIP registrar, which enabled its members to originate and terminate (receive) calls from and to each other directly over the Internet. The service was discontinued at the end of 2018.

In February 2021, the GNOME Git repository for the project was archived due to inactivity.

== Features ==
Features of Ekiga include:

=== Integration ===
Ekiga is integrated with a number of different software packages and protocols such as LDAP directories registration and browsing along with support for Novell Evolution so that contacts are shared between both programs and zeroconf (Apple Bonjour) support. It auto-detects devices including USB, ALSA and legacy OSS soundcards, Video4linux and FireWire camera.

=== User interface ===
Ekiga supports a Contact list based interface along with Presence support with custom messages. It allows for the monitoring of contacts and viewing call history along with an addressbook, dialpad, and chat window. SIP URLs and H.323/callto support is built-in along with full-screen videoconferencing (accelerated using a graphics card).

=== Technical features ===
- Call forwarding on busy, no answer, always (SIP and H.323)
- Call transfer (SIP and H.323)
- Call hold (SIP and H.323)
- DTMF support (SIP and H.323)
- Basic instant messaging (SIP)
- Text chat (SIP and H.323)
- Register with several registrars (SIP) and gatekeepers (H.323) simultaneously
- Ability to use an outbound proxy (SIP) or a gateway (H.323)
- Message waiting indications (SIP)
- Audio and video (SIP and H.323)
- STUN support (SIP and H.323)
- LDAP support
- Audio codec algorithms: iLBC, GSM 06.10, MS-GSM, G.711 A-law, G.711 μ-law, G.726, G.721, Speex, G.722, CELT (also G.723.1, G.728, G.729, GSM 06.10, GSM-AMR, G.722.2 [GSM‑AMR-WB] using Intel IPP)
- Video codec algorithms: H.261, H.263+, H.264, Theora, MPEG-4

== History ==
Ekiga was originally started over Christmas in the year 2000. Originally written by Damien Sandras it grew to being maintained by a team of nine regular contributors by 2011. Sandras wanted to create a Netmeeting clone for Linux as his graduating project at UCLouvain.

Ekiga was referred to as GnomeMeeting until 2004 when a name change was thought necessary by the developers. Concerns were cited that the original name was associated with a discontinued Microsoft product called NetMeeting, and not always recognized as VoIP software. It was also proposed that some people assumed they needed to run GNOME to run GnomeMeeting, which was no longer the case. Eventually on January 18, 2006 the name Ekiga was chosen based on an old way of communicating between villages in Cameroon. Around that the time the direction of the software project was changed and it turned into a SIP client.

The following shows major version releases:

- March 2004 – Version 1.0 under the name GnomeMeeting
- March 2006 – Version 2.0 was released under name Ekiga, it was bundled with GNOME 2.14
- April 2007 – Version 2.0.9 was the first version to include support for Microsoft Windows
- September 2008 – Version 3.0.0
- March 2009 – First release of the 3.2.x series. Added support for G.722 audio as well as unified the support for H.263 and H.263.
- November 2012 – Ekiga 4.0.0, "The Victory Release", is a major release with many major improvements.
- February 2013 – Ekiga 4.0.1, "The Victory Release", this version has many improvements.
- 2015 – Ekiga 5.0, new Version with GTK+ 3 and new codecs announced.

As of November 2024, Ekiga 5.0 was never released and the software is no longer maintained.

== See also ==
- Comparison of VoIP software
- Blink
- QuteCom
- Jitsi
- List of free and open-source software packages
- Twinkle
- SFLphone
- Tox
