= Chih-Wei Huang =

Taiwanese software developer

- Born: November 20, 1970 (age 55); Taipei, Taiwan
- Education: National Taiwan University (BS, MS)
- Occupation: Programmer
- Website: cwhuang.info at the Wayback Machine (archived 2009-08-14)

Chih-Wei Huang (黃志偉) is a Taiwanese software developer and promoter of free software who lives in Taiwan. He is famous for his work in the VoIP and internationalization and localization fields in Greater China. The user name he usually uses is cwhuang.

== Early career ==
Huang graduated from National Taiwan University (NTU) in 1993, with a bachelor's degree in physics, and earned a master's degree in electrical engineering from the university in 2000. He worked as a director in Top Technology Inc., the CTO of Citron Network Inc., and a project manager of Tecom Inc. Huang currently works as a senior researcher of Core Technology Center in ASUSTeK Computer Inc. He is one of the start members of Software Liberty Association of Taiwan (SLAT), and the first and second members of the SLAT Council.

== Free software development ==
Chih-Wei Huang is the founder and coordinator of the Chinese Linux Documentation Project (CLDP). He wrote the Linux Chinese HOWTO, and translated the HOWTO Index, Linux Meta-FAQ, Serial HOWTO, DNS HOWTO, Linux Information Sheet, Java-CGI HOWTO, IP Masquerade mini-HOWTO and so on. He developed the SGMLtools Chinese Kits to solve the Chinese processing issues of SGML.

He is also the second coordinator to the Chinese Linux Extensions (CLE). He has been a developer of CLE since v0.7 and became the coordinator of CLE v0.9. He pushed Chinese localization in KDE, GNOME and Abiword. He worked alongside Yuan-Chung Cheng and Tung-Han Hsieh to push Arphic Technology to release four Chinese TrueType fonts for the free software community under the Arphic Public License. He also wrote a book for CLE with others.

As Core Developer of GNU Gatekeeper (from 2001 to 2003), he developed new features like thread-safe runtime tables, neighbors and authentication modules, a full H.323 proxy and Citron's NAT technology. He wrote the first version of the English and Chinese manual for GnuGK. He won the first prize of Open Source Contest Taiwan in 2003.

He serves as a committer to KDE and GNOME, where he helps to translate .po files and fixes bugs related to Chinese. He is a contributor to pyDict, OpenH323, Asterisk, GStreamer etc. He works on a way to leverage the ASUS Eee PC with the power of the free software community and aims to provide a complete solution for Android on x86 platform. The Eee PC, VirtualBox, and QEMU are tested OK.

Chih-Wei Huang and Yi Sun started the Android-x86 Open Source Project in 2009. The project aims to bring Android to the x86 platform.

== See also ==
- GNU Gatekeeper Project
- Android-x86 Open Source Project
