= Gatekeeper (disambiguation) =

A gatekeeper is a person who controls access to something.

Gatekeeper or gatekeeping may also refer to:

== Computing ==
- H.323 Gatekeeper, a virtual network switch that manages a H.323 zone
- GNU Gatekeeper, an H.323 gatekeeper implementation
- GateKeeper, an MSN Chat authentication type
- Gatekeeper (macOS), a security feature of Apple's macOS operating system

== Science ==
- Gatekeeper butterfly (Pyronia tithonus), a European brown butterfly
- Gatekeeper neuron, a type of neuron in synaptic gating
- Gatekeeper gene, a gene type that regulates apoptosis and is relevant in the genetics of cancer

== Popular culture ==
- Gate Keepers, a 1999 video game and manga, as well as a 2000 anime series
- Gate Keepers 21, a 2002 OVA sequel to the Gate Keepers anime series
- GateKeeper (roller coaster), a roller coaster at Cedar Point amusement park in Ohio
- Gatekeeper (Fire Emblem), a character in the 2019 video game Fire Emblem: Three Houses
- Gatekeepers (game show), a 2010 Singaporean Chinese language game show
- The Gatekeeper, a 2002 film by John Carlos Frey
- The Gatekeepers (book), a 2002 book by Jacques Steinberg on admissions to college
- The Gatekeepers (film), a 2012 Israeli documentary film directed by Dror Moreh
- The Power of Five (released as The Gatekeepers in the United States), a series of five fantasy novels by Anthony Horowitz in 2005–2012
- Atmosfear: The Gatekeeper, a 2004 video board game, the first DVD version of the Atmosfear series
- "The Gatekeeper" (Moon Girl and Devil Dinosaur), an unaired episode of the series
- Clare Langtree the Gatekeeper, a character in the 2006 television series Power Rangers: Mystic Force
- Zuul, an evil demigod in the 1984 film Ghostbusters, who calls himself "the Gatekeeper" when possessing Dana

== Sports ==
- Gatekeeper (boxing), a professional boxer who is considered a test for aspiring boxers
- St. Louis GateKeepers, a men's roller derby team based in St. Louis, Missouri

== Music ==
- The Gatekeeper, also known as Frukwan, a member of the hip-hop group Gravediggaz
- Gatekeeper (band), an American experimental electronic duo from Chicago
- "Gatekeeper", a song by As I Lay Dying from the 2019 album Shaped by Fire
- "Gatekeeper", a song by Bleed from Within from the 2018 album Era
- "Gatekeeper", a song by Celldweller from the 2016 album Soundtrack for the Voices in My Head Vol. 03
- "Gatekeeper", a song by Jessie Reyez from the 2017 EP Kiddo
- "Gatekeeper", a song by Leslie Feist from the 2004 album Let It Die
- "Gatekeeper", a song by Within Temptation from the 1997 album Enter

== Other ==
- Gatekeeping (communication), a person or organization who manages or constrains a flow of knowledge
- Gatekeeper state, a concept in the writings of Frederick Cooper describing unstable post-independence states in Africa
- Gatekeeper parent, a parent who controls the relationship between a child and their other parent in family law
- Gatekeeper physician, a primary care physician, with a role of rationing patient access to specialized medicine
