= Boaz Raviv =

French-Israeli businessman

- בועז רביב
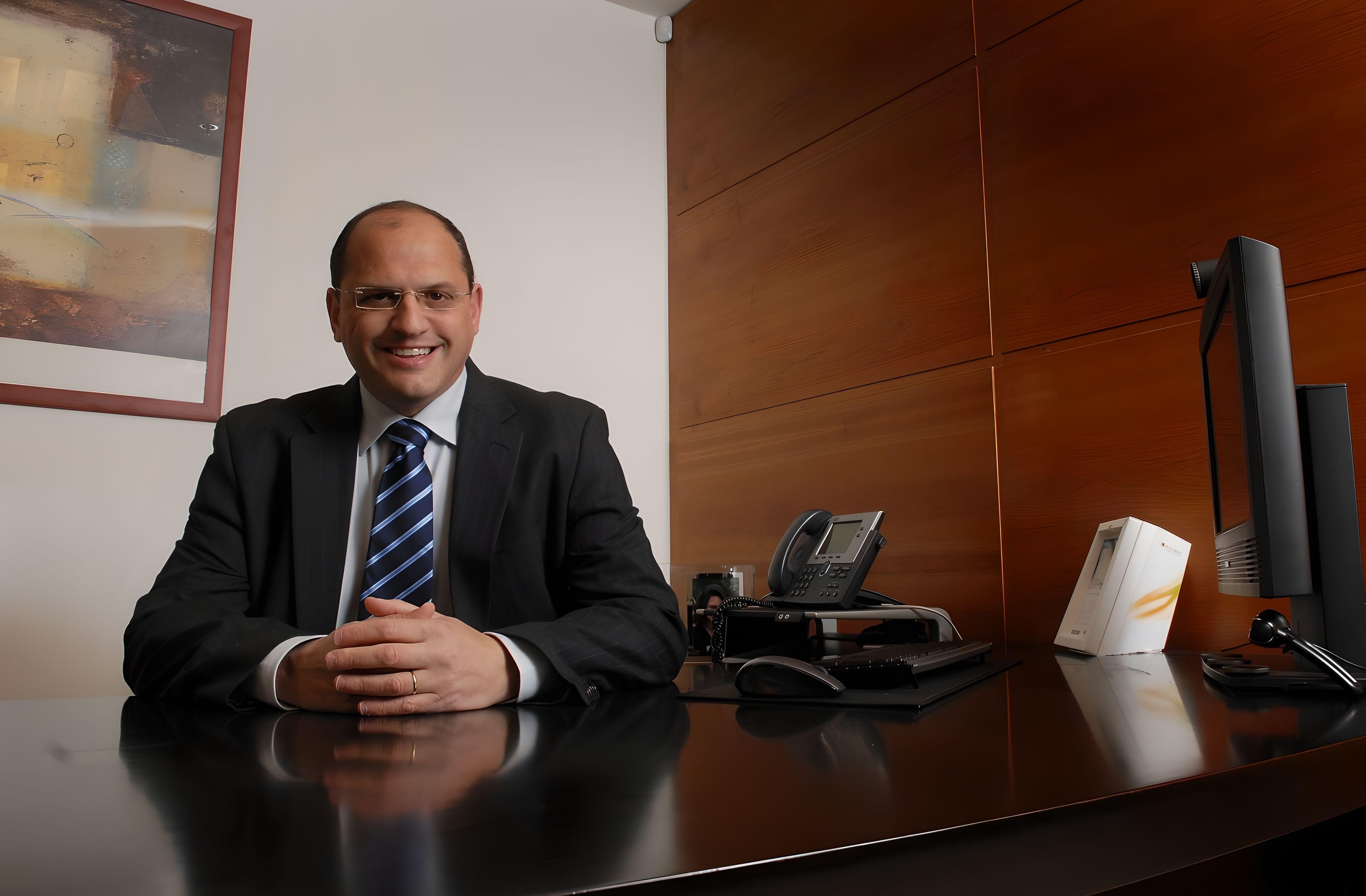
- Born: April 1, 1961 (age 64)
- Education: B.Sc. Technion - Israel Institute of Technology. Apprenticeship, IRSTEA - National Research Institute for Agriculture, Food and the Environment
- Occupation: Chief Executive Officer
- Father: Shmuel Raviv

Boaz Raviv (Hebrew: בועז רביב) born on April 1, 1961, is a French-Israeli CEO with extensive experience in the multinational technology sector. Throughout his career, he has held executive positions in various renowned companies. Notably, Raviv served as CEO at Attenti and Radvision. He also held the position of General Manager of Business Units at AVAYA, Radvision, Elron Telesoft, and made contributions as a development engineer at Capgemini. Since 2001, Raviv has actively engaged in investment, consulting, and mentoring activities, with a particular focus on high-tech companies.

== Biography ==
=== Education ===
Boaz Raviv was born in 1961 in Be'er Sheva. In 1972, he moved to Tel Aviv, where he grew up and received his education until 1983 when he relocated to Haifa. He pursued a degree in robotics engineering at the Technion - Israel Institute of Technology, which he successfully completed with honors. In 1988 he specialized in Image Analysis at the robotics laboratory of IRSTEA in Montpellier, France.

During his time in Montpellier, Raviv was part of a team involved in the construction of robots for agricultural purposes. He focused primarily on developing an artificial vision system that could accurately identify and sort harvested crops, as well as programming the robot's guidance system.

=== Engineering career ===
In 1989, Boaz Raviv joined the Paris office of Capgemini, where he took on various roles. Initially, he was assigned to Cegelec as a development engineer, specializing in SCADA (Supervisory Control and Data Acquisition) systems. Afterward, he returned to Capgemini and contributed to the acceptance testing project for Artère, a telecontrol network developed specifically for EDF (Electricité de France).

=== Business career ===
In 1995, Raviv returned to Israel and assumed the position of General Manager of the Telecom Division at Elron Telesoft, where he dedicated approximately 5 years of service. During this time, he played a role in the strategic planning and execution of the internet access infrastructure for Bezeq, a prominent Israeli telecommunications company. Additionally, he led the successful introduction of "Bezeqnet 135," an information services initiative that provided internet access to non-subscribers. Raviv spearheaded the development and implementation of first fintech systems in Israel, fundamentally transforming how private and commercial banks, as well as financial organizations, conducted their operations online. Notably, he established notable collaborations with esteemed financial institutions such as Bank Leumi, Mizrahi Tefahot, Visa Cal, Chase Manhattan and Softbank from Japan.

At the end of 2000s, Raviv joined Radvision as the General Manager of the technology unit, overseeing the development of software infrastructure, testing tools, and integrated voice, video, and data services for IP and 3G networks. These products were designed for telecommunications equipment manufacturers that utilized VoIP technology. In 2005, he expanded his role to include the leadership of multiple business units, with a specific focus on the video conferencing sector. In January 2006, he was promoted to the position of CEO, overseeing the entire organization.

During his nearly 6-year tenure as CEO of Radvision, Raviv focused on enhancing and completing the video conferencing product portfolio. The successful launch of the SCOPIA range established it as the company's flagship product line. Additionally, Raviv led mergers, acquisitions, and collaborations with renowned global technology companies, driving the growth and expansion of Radvision. Notably, Radvision acquired Aethra, an Italian company recognized for its high-definition end-point video systems. Raviv also orchestrated the strategic sale of Radvision to AVAYA, marking a significant milestone in the company's history and further solidifying its position in the industry.

In June 2012, after the sale of Radvision, Raviv joined AVAYA with the objective of ensuring the success of the acquisition and completing the integration of the SCOPIA suite into AVAYA's unified communication solutions portfolio known as Aura. In his role, Raviv took charge of the Mobility division, supervised the development center in Israel, and oversaw the sale of the technology division to Spirent Communications plc, a British company.

In 2017, Raviv became a part of the British private equity firm Apax Partners, which acquired the electronic monitoring businesses from 3M. Taking on the role of CEO at Attenti, he led the process of carving out a distinct and unified company in the global electronic monitoring market. Throughout this period, the business experienced growth and embarked on the development of next generation solutions. These innovative solutions empower law enforcement, correctional and rehabilitation agencies to utilize technology for monitoring and controlling court orders, including home curfew, restraining orders, and the protection of victims of domestic violence. Moreover, they offer an alternative to incarceration, providing a more comprehensive approach to rehabilitation.

In 2021, Raviv established his own private investment firm, dedicating himself to investment activities, consulting, and mentoring within the high-tech industry. He actively participates in providing financial support, strategic guidance, and mentorship to various high-tech companies.

=== Personal life ===
Boaz Raviv is the son of Dr. Shmuel Raviv, a distinguished scientist, inventor, and entrepreneur of Franco-Israeli origin. Boaz Raviv is married to Dr. Dana Landau, and he has four children Shir, Roni, Guy and Yoav.

== See also ==
=== Related articles ===
- Anderw Davis, "One on One with RADVISION CEO Boaz Raviv", Wainhouse Research, 3, Février 2010, p. 4-8 (en) (lire en ligne)
- Martha McKay, "Fixed and Wireless Videoconferencing May Soon Be Routine", Government Technology, 3, Août 2010 (en) (l ire en ligne)
- Shlomi Cohen, "Radvision optimistic", Globes, 17, Janvier 2006 (en) (lire en ligne)
- Shlomi Cohen, "Video in demand", SeekingAlpha, 10, Octobre 2006 (en) (lire en ligne)
- Bill Alpert, "Getting the World Wired", Barron's, 9, Octobre 2006 (en) (lire en ligne)
