= H.239 =

H.239 is an ITU-T recommendation from the H.32x Multimedia Communications' macrofamily of standards for multimedia communications over various networks.

The H.239 recommendation is titled "Role management and additional media channels for H.3xx-series terminals". Practical importance of this recommendation is its setting forth a way to have multiple video channels (e.g., one for conferencing, another for presentation) within a single session (call).

== History ==
H.239 builds on the ITU-T's H.32x (which includes H.323) and H.245 series of standards, called "recommendations" by the ITU.

Tandberg introduced the ability to send a computer or video presentation along with a video teleconference session in 2000 with their "DuoVideo" feature in February 2000.

PictureTel introduced People+Content in July 2000. Polycom then acquired PictureTel in May 2001 and began offering their proprietary, patented method to other vendors on a royalty-free basis in 2002.

In Feb. 2003 the ITU-T took up a proposal by vendors to create a standard based on Tandberg and Polycom technology. The ITU-T published this technology as Recommendation H.239 in July 2003.

== Overview ==
A traditional videoconference has an audio channel, a video channel and an optional data channel. The video channel typically carries the camera image of the participants. H.239 defines rules and messages for establishing an additional video/graphics channel, often to transmit a PC graphics presentation or video from a document camera, while still transmitting the video of the presenter.

For presentations in multipoint conferencing, H.239 defines token procedures to guarantee that only one endpoint in the conference sends the additional video channel which is then distributed to all conference participants.

The signaling for H.239 is defined in a way which simplifies implementation of gateways between H.323 and H.320.

== Procedure ==
When an H.323 call is connected, signaling defined in H.245 is used to establish the set of capabilities for all connected endpoints and MCUs. When the set of capabilities includes an indication that H.239 presentations are supported, a connected endpoint can choose to open an additional video channel. First the endpoint has to request a token from the MCU. The MCU then will check if there is another endpoint currently sending an additional video channel. The MCU will use token messages to make this endpoint stop sending the additional video channel. Then the MCU will acknowledge the token request from the first endpoint which then can begin to send the additional video channel which e.g. contains encoded video from a computer's video output at XGA resolution.

Similar procedures are defined for the case when two endpoints are directly connected to each other without an intermediate MCU.

== See also ==
- H.323
- Videoconferencing
- Computer display standard
