= 3G-324M =

3G-324M is the 3GPP umbrella protocol for video telephony in 3G mobile networks.

The 3G-324M protocol operates over an established circuit switched connection between two communicating peers. 3G-324M is an umbrella specification to enable conversational multimedia communication over Circuit Switched (CS) networks and has been adopted by the 3GPP. 3G-324M is based on the ITU-T H.324 specification for multimedia conferencing over Circuit switched networks. 3G-324M is composed of the following sub-protocols:

- ITU-T H.245 for call control
- ITU-T H.223 for bit streams to data packets multiplexer/demultiplexer
- ITU-T H.223 Annex A and B for error handling of low and medium BER detection, correction and concealment
- ITU-T H.324 with Annexes A and C for operating in wireless environment

The 3G-324M specification using the Circuit switched network allows delay sensitive conversational multimedia services such as:

- Videoconferencing for personal and business use
- Multimedia entertainment services
- Telemedicine
- Surveillance
- Live Video Broadcasting– Cable TV On-the-Go
- Video-on-demand (movies, news clips)

3G-324M is agnostic to the actual Circuit switched network that uses it. It can run as easily over UMTS as well as TD-SCDMA networks.

3G-324M operating over a circuit switched channel between two communication peers guarantees the fixed-delay quality of service for multimedia communications. Combining Circuit switched 3G-324M services with packet-based SIP services such as presence can leverage the strength of both networks to enable new types of differentiated and innovative mobile 3G services.

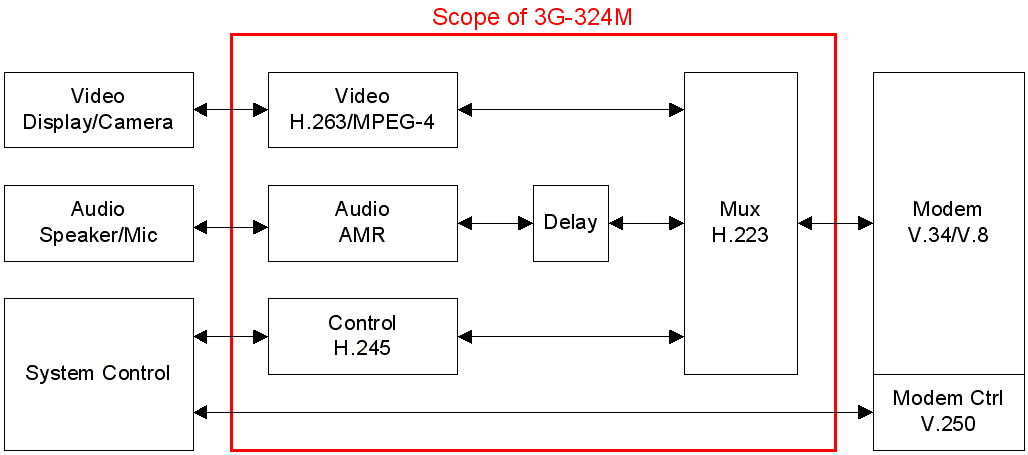

== Codecs ==
Audio Codec

- GSM Adaptive Multi-Rate, mandatory
- AMR-WB (G.722.2), optional
- ITU-T G.723.1, optional

Video Codec

- ITU-T H.263, mandatory
- ITU-T H.261, optional
- MPEG-4 part 2 simple profile 1 level 0, optional
- ITU-T H.264, optional
