= H323Plus =

The H323Plus project, formerly OpenH323, has as goal developing a full featured, open source (MPL) implementation of the H.323 Voice over IP protocol. The code is written in C++ and, through the development effort of numerous people around the world, fully supports the H.323 protocol. The software has been integrated into a number of open source and commercial software products.

== Software published under the OpenH323 project includes ==
=== The implementation of VoIP protocols ===
- PTLib - a multi-platform C++ class library. Programs based on PTLib can run on both Microsoft Windows and Unix/Linux. The library contains both the “basic” classes (strings, arrays, lists) and the higher-level functionality (networking, multi-threading).
- H323Plus – a library for the development of H.323 applications. It uses PTLib for platform independence. The library has its own ASN.1 parser that generates the classes for encoding and decoding of the protocol messages used in H.323.

=== Sample network phones implementations ===
- OhPhone: Command-line phone
- OpenPhone: GUI for OpenH323

=== H.323 Related ===
- OpenMCU: Conference server
- OpenAM: Answering machine
- OpenIVR: Interactive Voice Response
- GNU Gatekeeper: H.323 Gatekeeper
- PSTNGw: Serves as a gateway between H.323 and PSTN
- CallGen323: H.323 call generator

== Related Projects ==
- Open Phone Abstraction Library (OPAL)
