= Radvision =

Israeli telecommunication company

RADVISION
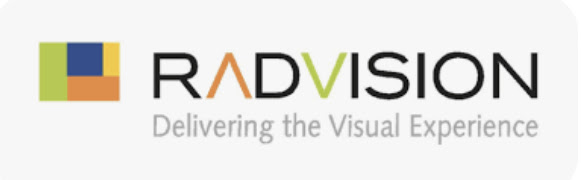

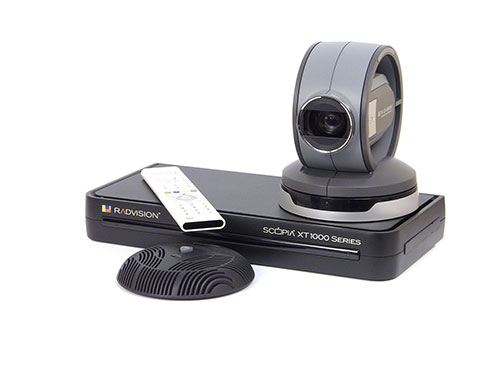
- Type: Public
- Industry: Videoconferencing, Teleconferencing, Collaboration, VOIP
- Founded: 1992; 34 years ago
- Headquarters: 211 Mt. Airy Road, Basking Ridge, New Jersey U.S.
- Key people: Ami Amir; Gadi Tamari; Boaz Raviv (CEO)
- Products: Scopia Videoconference systems, VoIP developerToolkits
- Revenue: ▲US$95,239 million (2010)
- Owner: AVAYA & Softil
- Number of employees: 430

Radvision was a provider of video conferencing solution and enabling products for IP communication developers based in Tel Aviv, Israel. Radvision was acquired by Avaya in June 2012. Spirent Communications acquired Radvision's Technology Business Unit from Avaya in July 2014, to become Spirent Developer Tools Business Unit.

== History ==
=== Beginning ===
Radvision was founded in 1992 by Ami Amir and Eli Doron with the goal of developing a video call management platform that would operate on users' personal computers through the organization's network. However, at that time, the demand for such a product was limited, which led the company to shift towards selling technological software toolkits to developers building VoIP equipment.

=== Technology Activities ===
Starting in 1995, Radvision participated in standardization activities for VoIP communication systems in collaboration with major players such as Intel and Microsoft. In the late 2000s, Radvision established a technology unit specializing in the development of software infrastructures, testing tools, and converged voice, video, and data services over IP and 3G networks.

In 2001, the company expanded its product range by adding full support for SIP protocols in addition to the dominant H.232 protocol at that time. At the same time, Radvision signed an agreement with Texas Instruments to integrate MEGACO into IP phones and VoIP gateways for residential and small office/home office environments.

In 2004, Radvision was selected by Freescale to provide development tools for applications that capitalized on the specialized processing capabilities of their chips. Additionally, during the same year, Radvision introduced an extensive suite of developer solutions specifically designed for 3G and WiFi technologies. Radvision adopted IMS technology in 2006 and signed a licensing agreement with Microsoft to provide SIP-based Live Communications Server-compatible tools. In 2010, the company collaborated with Samsung to develop a dedicated multimedia LCD monitor for HD video conferencing. Additionally, the company introduced BEEHD, a new client framework for desktop, embedded, and mobile devices, offering a comprehensive solution for advanced video communications

=== Video Activities ===
Scopia

Radvision quickly established itself as a major player in the field of video conferencing. In 1993, they developed innovative technology enabling real-time video transfer over IP networks. The following year, in 1994, Radvision introduced a video gateway connecting IP and ISDN networks, paving the way for advanced video communications. In 1996, the company unveiled its range of viaIP video conferencing solutions, followed by the introduction of a Gatekeeper system (ECS) in 1998.

In early 2001, Radvision collaborated with Cisco to launch a range of video conferencing products based on its technology. In 2006, they also partnered with Lifesize to collaborate on high-definition video communications. Simultaneously, they implemented video conferencing systems in the networks of major service providers. In 2010, Radvision established a new strategic partnership with Microsoft to develop a powerful combination of hardware and software solutions integrated with Microsoft Lync. As a pioneer in the field of technology gateways, Radvision introduced the SCOPIA 3G Video Gateway in 2007, becoming the first product in the emerging 3G industry. In 2012, Radvision enriched its video conferencing offerings with the SCOPIA suite, which emerged as one of the most high-performance HD video conferencing systems in its category.

=== IPO, Mergers and Acquisitions Activities ===
In March 2000, Radvision went public on NASDAQ (RVSN) and successfully raised $76 million, with a valuation of $380 million. Its shares were traded on both the NASDAQ and Tel Aviv Stock Exchanges until June 2012. In early 2001, Gadi Tamari took over from Ami Amir, and starting from January 2006, Boaz Raviv assumed the role of CEO until the company was acquired by AVAYA in June 2012.

Radvision also expanded its activities through mergers and acquisitions. In 2004, they acquired Visionex, a Chinese company, along with its IView management platform. This acquisition strengthened Radvision's presence in the video conferencing market, particularly in the field of management solutions.

In 2005, Radvision acquired FVC.com, a company specializing in video conferencing, along with their software product Click to Meet (formerly CU-SeeMe). This acquisition enhanced Radvision's product range and enabled them to offer more comprehensive solutions for workstations.

In 2009, a significant acquisition occurred when Cisco acquired Radvision's competitor, Tandberg, for approximately $3.3 billion. This acquisition had a significant impact on the video conferencing industry and opened new opportunities for Radvision by strengthening its own brand position in the global market.

In 2010, Radvision continued its acquisition strategy by purchasing the assets of the Italian company AETHRA. This acquisition allowed Radvision to expand its product portfolio by adding high-quality video conferencing room systems. It further strengthened their market position and enabled them to meet customer needs with a more comprehensive SCOPIA offering.

Finally, in 2012, Radvision was acquired by Avaya, a company specializing in enterprise unified collaboration.

=== Locations ===
Radvision has its headquarters in Israel, with offices in the United States, United Kingdom, Brazil, India, Hong Kong, Japan, Korea, China, and Singapore.

== See also ==
- CU-seeMe
- One on One with RADVISION CEO
- List of VOIP companies
- Telepresence
- Videotelephony
