= G.723 =

ITU-T Recommendation

- Extensions of Recommendation G.721 adaptive differential pulse code modulation to 24 and 40 kbit/s for digital circuit multiplication equipment application
- Status: Withdrawn
- Latest version: (11/88); November 1988
- Organization: ITU-T
- Base standards: G.721
- Related standards: G.726
- Domain: audio compression
- License: Freely available
- Website: https://www.itu.int/rec/T-REC-G.723

G.723 is an ITU-T standard speech codec using extensions of G.721 providing voice quality covering 300 Hz to 3400 Hz using Adaptive Differential Pulse Code Modulation (ADPCM) to 24 and 40 kbit/s for digital circuit multiplication equipment (DCME) applications. The standard G.723 is obsolete and has been superseded by G.726.

== See also ==
- List of codecs
- G.723 [withdrawn] – Extensions of Recommendation G.721 adaptive differential pulse code modulation to 24 and 40 kbit/s for digital circuit multiplication equipment application. The content of the 1988 edition of ITU-T G.723 is now covered by ITU-T G.726.
- G.723.1 – Dual rate speech coder for multimedia communications transmitting at 5.3 and 6.3 kbit/s
- G.726 – 40, 32, 24, 16 kbit/s Adaptive Differential Pulse Code Modulation (ADPCM). Corresponding ANSI-C code is available in the G.726 module of the ITU-T G.191 Software Tools Library.
