= Scopia =

Series of videoconferencing products

- Type: Radvision's series of unified communications products that provide meet-me, videoconferencing and online collaboration
- Inventor: Radvision
- Manufacturer: Radvision
- Available: no

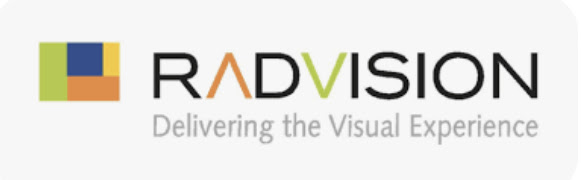
Radvision

Scopia, within the computer networking and telecommunications fields, is a series of unified communications products that provide meet-me, videoconferencing and online collaboration. The Scopia products include the Scopia XT Telepresence, Scopia XT7100 Room System (supporting also the H.265 standard), Scopia XT5000 Room System, Scopia XT4300 Room System, SCOPIA XT1000 Piccolo, XT Meeting Center Room System, Scopia Firewall Traversal, Multipoint control units, Gateways, Scopia Control, Scopia Desktop Video Conferencing, and Scopia Mobile HD Video Conferencing. The Scopia products are developed and sold by Avaya and their Business Partner network.

== History ==
On 30 April 2012 shareholders approved the acquisition of Radvision by Avaya for about $230 million. Plans were announced in June to integrate Radvision products with the Avaya Aura Unified Communication systems.

== XT5000 room systems ==
The Scopia XT5000 is a unified communication video conferencing system with many video conferencing endpoint options. The system is capable of dual 1080p/60fps live video content, HD Audio, H.264, Scalable Video Coding (SVC), along with iPad multi-touch control. The XT5000 system also automatically scales bandwidth in unpredictable network environments during the video conferencing. The Scopia XT5000 systems include the 5200 Advanced Telecommunications Computing Architecture (ATCA) carrier grade systems (5230 and 5215 systems), and the XT5100 systems (5120, 5115, 5110, and 5105).

=== Awards ===
- Editor’s Choice Award for achievement in 2009 from industry analyst Telepresence and Videoconferencing Insight Newsletter
- 2012 Frost & Sullivan New Product Innovation Award
- JITC Certified

== XT4200 room system ==
High Definition video communications. The features include 720p/60fps live video and content, HD audio, H.264 High Profile and Scalable Video Coding, dual display support and a wide angle Pan–tilt–zoom (PTZ) camera.

== Desktop and mobile ==
The desktop software is compatible with both Microsoft Windows and Mac systems, and works with the web browsers: Internet Explorer, Firefox, Safari and Google Chrome. The system uses H.323 and SIP standards to inter-operate with other video conferencing systems. Scalable Video Coding insures performance over congested networks without affecting other users. The Scopia Content Slider feature allows users of Scopia Desktop and Scopia Mobile clients to individually review already presented content (slides, annotated whiteboards etc.) during a presentation.

Scopia Mobile allows HD video conferencing from mobile devices such as the iPad, iPhone iPod and Android Wireless connection speeds over cell systems varies greatly and NetSense optimizes the conference session as it monitors the connection quality, dynamically changing from HD video to whatever the connection can support as needed.

No client is known to work under other operating systems (Linux, for example). A cross-platform WebRTC endpoint is available only on select Scopia server units.

== Gateways ==
- ISDN gateway
- TIP Gateway
- Microsoft Gateway
- SCOPIA 3G Video Gateway

== See also ==
- List of video telecommunication services and product brands
- CU-SeeMe
