= Android-x86 =

Unofficial port of the Android mobile operating system

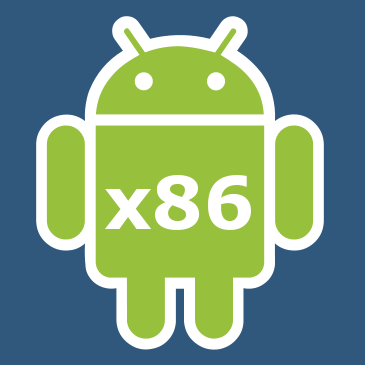
- Developer: Chih-Wei Huang, Yi Sun
- OS family: Android (Linux)
- Source model: Open source (includes proprietary components such as Google Play)
Latest release
- Android 9.0: r2 (based on Android Pie 9.0.0 (android-9.0.0_r54)) / March 25, 2020; 6 years ago
- Android 8.1: r6 (based on Android Oreo 8.1.0 (android-8.1.0_r81)) / June 23, 2021; 5 years ago
- Android 7.1: r5 (based on Android Nougat 7.1.2 (android-7.1.2_r39)) / February 14, 2021; 5 years ago
- Kernel type: Monolithic (modified Linux kernel)
- License: Apache License 2.0
- Official website: www.android-x86.org

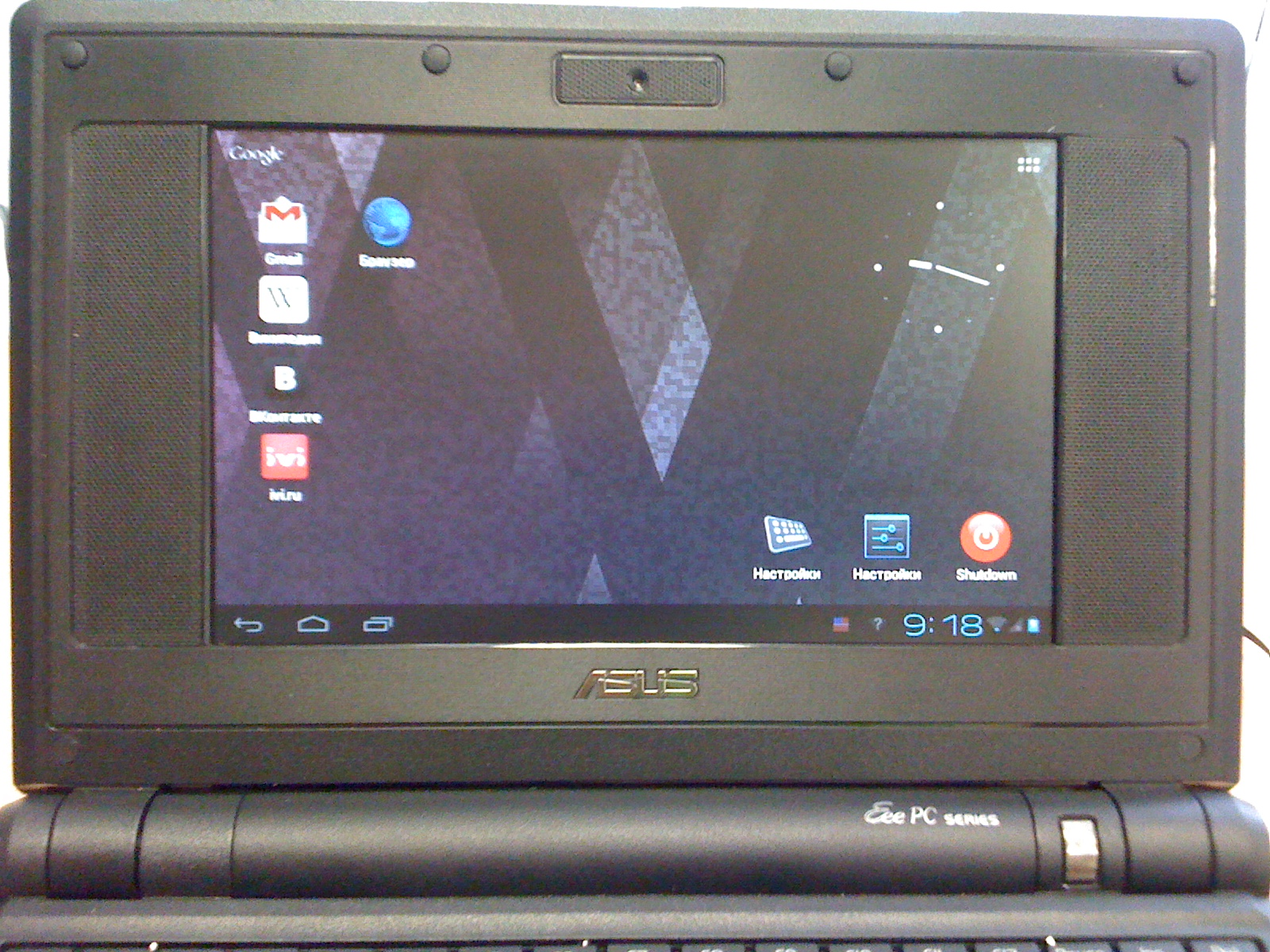
Android x86 (ver. 4.0) on EeePC 701 4G

Android-x86 was an unofficial port of the Android mobile operating system (developed by the Open Handset Alliance) for the Intel x86 platform. It is an open source project designed to make Android run on devices powered by x86 processors (such as PCs), rather than RISC-based ARM chips.

Developers Chih-Wei Huang and Yi Sun originated the project in 2009. The project began as a series of patches to the Android source code to enable Android to run on various netbooks, tablets and ultra-mobile PC. Huang was the project maintainer and as of 2021 active developers included Mauro Rossi and Michael Goffioul. As of 2025, the project is considered inactive or discontinued.

== Overview ==
The OS is based on the Android Open Source Project (AOSP) with some modifications and improvements. Some components are developed by the project which allow it to run on PC architecture. For instance, some low-level components are replaced to better suit the platform, such as the kernel and HALs. The OS enables OpenGL ES hardware acceleration via Mesa if supported GPUs are detected, including Intel GMA, AMD's Radeon, Nvidia's chipsets (Nouveau), VMware (vmwgfx) and QEMU (virgl). Without a supported GPU, the OS can run in non-accelerated mode via software rendering. Since release 7.1, the software renderer has been implemented via the SwiftShader project.

Like a normal Linux distribution, the project releases pre-built ISO images which can run under live mode or installed to a hard disk on the target system. Since release 4.4-r2, the project also releases efi_img which can be used to create a live USB to be booted from on UEFI systems. Since release 4.4-r4, the UEFI support was united into the ISO images and efi_img was marked as deprecated.

Except AOSP, the following incomplete list of components are developed from scratch or derived from other open source projects to form the entire Android-x86 codebase:

- Kernel
- Installer
- drm_gralloc and gbm_gralloc
- Mesa
- SwiftShader
- Audio
- Camera
- GPS
- Lights
- Radio Interface Layer
- Sensors

More and more components may be added to the updated version.

History
Version	Android version	Release date	Status
0.9	1.5 (Cupcake)	2009-07-29	Discontinued
1.6	1.6 (Donut)	2009-11-20	Discontinued
2.2	2.1 (Eclair)	2010-06-30	Discontinued
2.3	2.3 (Gingerbread)	2011-08-28	Discontinued
3.2	3.0 (Honeycomb)	2011-08-28	Discontinued
4.0	4.0.3 (Ice Cream Sandwich)	2012-01-01	Discontinued
4.2	4.2 (Jellybean)	2012-12-25	Discontinued
4.3	4.3 (Jellybean)	2013-07-25	Discontinued
4.4	4.4.2 (KitKat)	2014-08-08	Discontinued
5.1	5.1.1 (Lollipop)	2015-10-07	Discontinued
6.0	6.0.1 (Marshmallow)	2016-09-13	Discontinued
7.1	7.1.2 (Nougat)	2017-06-08	Maintained
8.1	8.1.0 (Oreo)	2019-01-15	Maintained
9.0	9.0.0 (Pie)	2020-02-27	Maintained
10.0	10.0 (Q)	?	Source Code (Work In Progress)
11.0	11.0 (R)	?	Source Code (Work In Progress)

Legend:
Unsupported
Supported
Latest version
Future version

== Related projects ==
=== Bliss OS ===
An open source OS based on Android-x86. Supported on Chromebooks, PCs, and tablets.

=== Project Celadon ===
A related project, Celadon (formerly Android-IA) has been produced by Intel that will run on newer UEFI devices. The project states that its intention is to drive Android support and innovation on Intel Architecture in addition to providing a venue for collaboration. It re-used the drm_gralloc graphics HAL module from Android-x86 in order to support Intel HD Graphics hardware. Back as Android-IA, it provided a FAQ with more detailed information.

=== Remix OS ===
Jide Technologies partnered with Chih-Wei Huang, the main developer of Android-x86, on Remix OS, a closed-source derivative of Android-x86 designed for use on conventional PCs. The first beta of Remix OS was made available on March 1, 2016. The project was discontinued on July 17, 2017.

=== Android TV x86 ===
In late 2020, a senior member of XDA Developers created Android TV x86 to provide Android TV for PCs, which "should work out of the box because the ROM has its roots in the Android-x86 project".

== See also ==
- Linux
  - ChromiumOS
  - Ubuntu
- Anbox - A free and open-source compatibility layer that aims to allow mobile applications and mobile games developed for Android to run on Linux distributions.
- BlueStacks
- Windows Subsystem for Android
- DuOS-M
- List of operating systems
