= Global Dialing Scheme =

The Global Dialing Scheme (GDS) is numbering plan for H.323 audio-visual communication networks (often used for videoconferencing). Based on the numerology provided by the United Nations International Telecommunication Union, GDS numerology resembles the international telephone system numbering plan, with some exceptions.

The Global Dialing Scheme uses a hierarchy of gatekeepers to route call set-up information nationally and internationally. National gatekeepers have knowledge of all zones within a country, World gatekeepers have knowledge of all National gatekeepers.

Each basic number consists of four parts: ⟨IAC⟩⟨CC⟩⟨OP⟩⟨EN⟩ (International Access Code, Country Code, Organizational Prefix, Endpoint Number).

== GDS history ==
In 2000, Victor Reis at HEAnet, Egon Verharen at SURFNet and Steve Williams at The Welsh Video Network began meeting by IP videoconference to discuss the requirements for an international H.323 videoconferencing dialling scheme that would allow E.164 dialling, avoiding clashes through the duplication of number spaces. Tim Poe from the University of North Carolina joined this meeting bringing USA involvement through VIDEnet and the NASM group.

It was envisaged that the GDS would be in place only for a few years until SIP/e-mail address dialling was adopted by vendors - in 2012 the GDS is still in use.

== GDS around the world ==
GDS is used heavily in many of the European countries. Educonf, as part of GÉANT, maintains a connectivity table and interactive map which displays which countries currently run and maintain active GDS gatekeepers. Many countries also have a series of test numbers that can be dialed for both technical testing and GDS connectivity verification.

== GDS in North America ==
The North American root gatekeepers serve the United States and its territories, Canada, Bermuda, and many Caribbean nations, including Anguilla, Antigua & Barbuda, Bahamas, Barbados, British Virgin Islands, Cayman Islands, Dominica, Dominican Republic, Grenada, Jamaica, Montserrat, St. Kitts and Nevis, St. Lucia, St. Vincent and the Grenadines, Trinidad and Tobago, and Turks & Caicos. Their purpose is to resolve h.323 numbers at the '001' prefix level under the Global Dialing Scheme (GDS) plan.

Terminology in this document follows the ⟨IAC⟩⟨CC⟩⟨OP⟩⟨EN⟩ format of general GDS documentation. The ‘001’ above refers to the IAC of 00 and the CC of 1 for North America.

This North American node of the Global Dialing Scheme utilizes an enhanced version of the North American Numbering Plan (NANP) to distribute addresses. The address space is divided into two parts: North American E.164 Space and North American Super Space. North American E.164 Space correlates to existing telephone number assignments and is well-suited for IP telephony applications. North American Super Space utilizes unused NANP address space starting with 0 or 1 to create an address space that is separate from existing telephone numbering addresses. This North American Super Space is well suited to video over IP or other all-IP applications that desire to be distinct from telephony applications and NANP regulations.

GDS users in North America may request addresses in either or both spaces, if needed.

North American E.164 Space

Addresses allocated from this range will be based upon the ITU-T e.164 telephone number assigned to the current subscriber of a range of telephone numbers, rather than to the service provider carrying those numbers. For example, if a university held +1.919.226.6100 through +1.919.226.6199, then that university would be eligible for the GDS prefix 00191922661. That university could assign the remaining two digits to endpoints 00-99. Aside from maintaining direct inward dial (DID) capability for endpoints, there is no reason to limit endpoint numbering to two digits. For example, the university might use five digit endpoint numbers for a total address space of 001919226610000 through 001919226619999, yielding 10,000 usable addresses. Organizations that do not have a DID range may use this extension technique to map their entire address space onto a single 10-digit telephone number. Implementors of voice over IP applications may wish to adhere more strictly to the NANP numbering convention.

North America Super Space

The organizational prefixes ⟨OP⟩ of addresses in North American Super Space (NASS) start with a 0 or 1 immediately following the country code (1). These digits are not assigned under the NANP, being used rather for special indications as described in 1947 by AT&T and Bell Laboratories.

NASS addresses are of the form:

001PX9⟨EN⟩

Where P is a 0 or 1. X is a variable length string of digits consisting of any digit between 0 and 8. 9 is used as a delimiter. ⟨EN⟩ is a variable length user-defined number consisting of any digits 0-9. Thus, NASS addresses are variable in length.

Some examples of fully qualified GDS NASS addresses; all address below contain the GDS IAC (00) and CC (1) with endpoint numbers indicated as ⟨EN⟩:

0010 Reserved

00119⟨EN⟩ (OP = 19)

001109⟨EN⟩ (OP = 109)

001119⟨EN⟩ (OP = 119)

001129⟨EN⟩ (OP = 129)

001139⟨EN⟩ (OP = 139)

001189⟨EN⟩ (OP = 189)

00110123456789⟨EN⟩ (OP = 10123456789)

Actual Dialing With the onset of Cisco Telepresence which uses the Cisco Unified Communications Manager (CUCM - previously known as CallManager), some modifications have been made for dialing with North America. Specifically within North America, the need to dial the '00' as part of the GDS string is no longer required. This was done to eliminate end-user confusion and bring GDS closer to look like real world dialing numbers. It was also done because the Cisco Call Manager only routes legit phone-based e.164 numbers even if they are not going over the telephone lines. So in order to allow SIP based devices to take place and use GDS, the removal of the 00 requirement was applied. Dialing with the '00' will still work, however it is not required as the translation for handling the '00' is done on the back end. Currently this only applies to GDS zones within North America.
