= Open Phone Abstraction Library =

In the field of VoIP networking, the Open Phone Abstraction Library (OPAL) continues the open-source openh323 project to support a wide range of commonly used protocols used to send voice, video and fax data over IP networks rather than being tied to the H.323 protocol. Initially, from 2007, OPAL supported the H.323 and Session Initiation Protocol (SIP) protocols, but it has grown to include Asterisk IAX2.

== About ==
OPAL implements a wide range of Voice over IP (VoIP) protocols for voice, video and fax data over IP networks.

It is written in C++ and released under the Mozilla Public Licence.

OPAL utilises the PTLib portable library that allows OPAL to run on a variety of platforms including Unix/Linux/BSD, MacOSX, Windows, Windows mobile and embedded systems.

Opal was developed as a derivative of the OpenH323 library.

== Applications ==
OPAL is used by the open source Video Conferencing Program Ekiga (formerly GnomeMeeting).
