= NetMeeting =

Discontinued videoconferencing software

- Screenshot of NetMeeting for Windows XP
- Developer: Microsoft
- Release: May 29, 1996; 30 years ago
- Final release: 3.02 / March 22, 2007; 19 years ago
- Operating system: Microsoft Windows
- Type: Videotelephony
- Website: microsoft.com/windows/netmeeting at the Wayback Machine (archived 2000-03-04)

NetMeeting is a discontinued VoIP and multi-point videoconferencing program offered by Microsoft. NetMeeting allows multiple clients to host and join a call that includes video and audio, text chat, application and desktop sharing, and file sharing. It was originally bundled with Internet Explorer 3 and then with Windows versions from Windows 95 to Windows Server 2003.

== History ==
NetMeeting was released on May 29, 1996, with Internet Explorer 3 and later Internet Explorer 4. It incorporated technology acquired by Microsoft from UK software developer Data Connection Ltd and DataBeam Corporation (subsequently acquired by Lotus Development).

Before video service became common on free IM clients, such as Yahoo! Messenger and MSN Messenger, NetMeeting was a popular way to perform video conferences and chat over the Internet (with the help of public ILS servers, or "direct-dialing" to an IP address). The defunct TechTV channel even used NetMeeting as a means of getting viewers onto their call-in shows via webcam, although viewers had to call on their telephones, because broadband Internet connections were still rare.

== Protocol architecture ==
NetMeeting is an implementation of the ITU T.120 and H.323 protocol stacks for videoconferencing, with Microsoft extensions. A call is set up, undertaken and torn down between NetMeeting clients using the H.225 protocol. Audio is carried using H.245, encoded using the G.711 and G.723.1 codecs from 5.3 to 64 kbit/s, while the video is encoded using the H.263 and H.261 codecs. Application sharing is performed using the "Share 2.0" protocol, based on a pre-release version of T.128, with the protocol also being used to transport chat messages; whiteboard sharing uses ITU T.126, while file sharing is performed using FTP over T.127. Due to its use of a standardised protocol, NetMeeting can interoperate with other H.323-implementing software, such as Ekiga.

== Discontinuation ==
In Windows XP, the Start menu shortcut to NetMeeting was removed “by design”. Users had to start conf.exe manually from the Start menu Run dialog.

As of Windows Vista, NetMeeting is no longer included with Microsoft Windows. NetMeeting can still be installed and run on the 32-bit versions of Windows Vista, as Microsoft published an update for 32-bit versions of Windows Vista on March 22, 2007 that installs NetMeeting 3.02 on Windows Vista Business, Enterprise or Ultimate editions. However, some features are not available in 3.02 such as remote desktop sharing invitations (incoming) and whiteboard area selection. Microsoft has stated that the Vista compatible version is unsupported and is only meant as a transition tool to help support collaboration sessions when used with Windows XP-based computers. On Windows 7 Professional, Enterprise, or Ultimate, users can use Windows XP Mode to run NetMeeting.

Microsoft originally recommended using newer applications such as Meeting Space, Remote Desktop, Remote Assistance, Skype, Microsoft Office Live Meeting and SharedView in place of NetMeeting. Skype for Business Server and Skype for Business (known previously by Office Communicator and Lync), and Microsoft Teams represent recent videoconferencing products from Microsoft, which may be considered successors to NetMeeting.

== Reception ==
ZDNET noted that since it was only available for Microsoft Windows, adoption was limited to users of that platform.

== See also ==
- Ekiga: a free and open source VoIP and video conferencing application that uses H.323
- H323Plus: an implementation of the H.323 VoIP protocol suite that has been integrated into a number of open source and commercial software products
