= OpenH323 =

The OpenH323 project had as its goal the development of a full featured, open source (MPL) implementation of the H.323 Voice over IP protocol. The code was written in C++ and, through the development effort of numerous people around the world, supported a broad subset of the H.323 protocol. The software has since been integrated into a number of open source and commercial software products.

The project was forked into two new projects in October 2007. Each of these projects has a different focus:

- The Open Phone Abstraction Library (OPAL) project continued the architectural development of OpenH323 with the goal of integrating additional VoIP protocols such as SIP and IAX2 changing the API considerably.
- The H323Plus project continued the expansion of the support for H.323 as well as support for existing OpenH323 applications.

== History ==
Initial work commenced on OpenH323 in 1998, although the underlying abstraction library (then called PWLib, now called PTLib) had been in existence since 1992. This work was performed under the banner of an Australian company called Equivalence Pty Ltd which consisted of two developers, Craig Southeren and Robert Jongbloed.

Both PWLib and OpenH323 were released as open source software under MPL license in late 1998, and the openh323.org domain name was first registered at this time. The code was made available via a private server at that domain. Coding on a derivative of OpenH323 (the Open Phone Abstraction Library or OPAL) started in late 1999 and was released under the same license and from the same website and CVS repository.

In early 2000, Robert and Craig sold Equivalence Pty Ltd and the rights to the openh323.org domain name to a US company called Quicknet Technologies Inc. They were also employed by Quicknet to support OpenH323 and to develop associated software. The OpenH323 CVS and mailing list was moved to a new server managed by Quicknet.

The OpenH323 CVS was moved to SourceForge in May 2003. Robert and Craig ceased employment with Quicknet in June 2003.

In October 2007, PWLib was renamed to PTLib. The OPAL and PTLib repositories were migrated to Subversion and maintenance of these codebases was moved to the SourceForge opalvoip project. A fork of OpenH323 called H323Plus was created at the same time and was moved to the SourceForge H323Plus project.

There is no known development currently active on the OpenH323 codebase.

== Related projects ==
- Open Phone Abstraction Library (OPAL)
- H323Plus
- GnuGk
