= Remix OS =

Android operating system for Intel-based PCs

- Developer: Jide Technology
- Written in: C (core), C++, Java (UI)
- OS family: Android (Linux)
- Working state: Discontinued
- Source model: Closed source with open source parts
- Latest release: 3.0 for ARM devices, 3.0.207 for PCs / November 25, 2016; 9 years ago
- Marketing target: PC, tablets
- Available in: English
- Package manager: APK
- Supported platforms: IA-32, x86-64, ARM
- Kernel type: Monolithic
- License: Freeware
- Official website: RemixOS at the Wayback Machine (archived 2017-07-18)

Support status
- Unsupported as of July 17, 2017

Remix OS is a discontinued computer operating system for personal computers with x86 and ARM architectures that, prior to discontinuation of development, shipped with a number of 1st- and 3rd-party devices. Remix OS allowed PC users to run apps made for Android mobile apps on any compatible Intel-based PC.

In January 2016 Jide announced a beta version of their operating system called Remix OS for PC, which is based on Android-x86 — a x86-port of the Android operating system — and available for download for free from their website. The beta version of Remix OS for PC brings hard drive installation, 32-bit support, UEFI support and OTA updates. Except for the free software licensed parts available on GitHub, unlike Android-x86, the source code of Remix OS is not available to the public.

Jide Technology
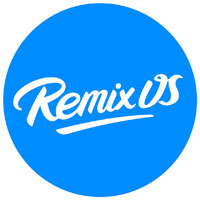
- Company type: Private
- Industry: Mobile computing
- Founded: 2014
- Defunct: July 17, 2017 (original)
- Fate: Shift from consumer products
- Products: Remix OS operating system Remix OS desktop computers Remix OS tablet devices

Google Mobile Services (GMS) were removed from the Remix Mini after Remix OS Update: 3.0.207 which Jide claimed was to "ensure a consistent experience across all Android devices for all." Later comments suggest that there was a compatibility issue with some apps which resulted in Google requesting that GMS not be pre-loaded.

On July 17, 2017, Jide announced that development of Remix OS for PC, as well as related consumer products in development, was being discontinued, stating that the company would be "restructuring [their] approach to Remix OS and transitioning away from the consumer space".

PhoenixOS and PrimeOS are similar Android-x86 based operating systems developed by other companies independently.

== Version history ==
There were three versions of Remix OS: Remix OS for PC, Remix OS for Remix Ultratablet and Remix OS for Remix Mini:

Remix OS for PC:

Version	Release date
3.0.207	November 25, 2016
3.0.206	October 12, 2016
3.0.203	September 1, 2016
3.0.102	August 2, 2016
3.0.101	July 26, 2016
2.0.403	July 15, 2016
2.0.402	July 5, 2016
2.0.205	April 26, 2016
2.0.202	March 31, 2016
2.0.102	February 2, 2016
2.0.109	January 25, 2016

Remix Ultratablet:

Version	Release date
2.0.303	Unknown
2.0	Unknown

Remix Mini:

Version	Release date
2.0.626	November 11, 2016
2.0.621	November 4, 2016
2.0.611	October 12, 2016
2.0.604	September 22, 2016
2.0.510	August 9, 2016
2.0.307	May 5, 2016
2.0.206	April 21, 2016
2.0.203	March 17, 2016
2.0.111	January 19, 2016
2.0.106	December 30, 2015
2.0.104	December 16, 2015
B2015111701	November 27, 2015
B2015110601	November 18, 2015
B2015110201	November 12, 2015

A Remix OS 3.0 device, the Remix Pro 2-in-1 tablet, had been announced in 2016; however, these will no longer be made.

== Legacy ==
Due to the popularity and affordability of the OS in Asia, similar projects have been made by various firms. Most notably PhoenixOS by the Chinese-based Chaozhuo Technology, and PrimeOS by the Indian-based Floydwiz Technologies Private Limited.

Just like RemixOS, both are predominantly closed source, with a lot of improved features intended to improve and optimise both OSes for newer applications and PCs.

Projects like OPENTHOS and BlissOS intend to release the project with open source in mind, but OPENTHOS is restricted to only Chinese markets at the moment, and BlissOS is based on Android-x86.
