= H.460 =

H.460 is a series of extensions to the H.323 videoconferencing standard from the ITU. Introduced in 2005, several of the extensions, including H.460.17, H.460.18 and H.460.19, deal with firewall and NAT traversal. For example, they enable end points to communicate with each other without the need of intermediate nodes.
