= NYSERNet =

Non-profit Internet service provider in New York State

NYSERNet, Inc. (New York State Education and Research Network), is a non-profit Internet service provider in New York State. It mainly provides Internet access to universities, colleges, museums, health care facilities, primary and secondary schools, and research institutions.

== History ==
NYSERNet was founded in 1986 in Troy, New York. Its founders compared NYSERNet's network with the Erie Canal and considered it the next step in two centuries to draw the country together. NYSERNet's network reaches from Buffalo to New York City. Completed in 1987, it was the first statewide regional IP network in the United States. Initial speed of 56 kbps was upgraded to T1 in 1989 and T3 in 1994.

It was the original assignee of AS174 according to RFC1117. This ASN is used today by Cogent Communications for their global network.
