= H.324 =

- Terminal for low bit-rate multimedia communication
- Status: In force
- Latest version: 5.0; April 2009
- Organization: ITU-T
- Related standards: G.711, G.722, G.723.1, 3G-324M
- Website: https://www.itu.int/rec/T-REC-H.324

H.324 is an ITU-T recommendation for voice, video and data transmission over regular analog phone lines. It uses a regular 33,600 bit/s modem for transmission, the H.263 codec for video encoding and G.723.1 for audio.

H.324 standard is formally known as Terminal for low bit-rate multimedia communication. H.324 covers the technical requirements for very low bit-rate multimedia telephone terminals operating over the General Switched Telephone Network (GSTN). H.324 terminals provide real-time video, audio, or data, or any combination, between two multimedia telephone terminals over a GSTN voice band network connection.

H.324 terminals offering audio communication shall support the G.723.1 audio codec. H.324 terminals offering video communication shall support the H.263 and H.261 video codecs. G.722.1 may be used for wideband audio applications. Annex G of H.324 specification defines usage of ISO/IEC 14496-1 (MPEG-4 Systems) generic capabilities in H.324 terminals. H.324/I terminals shall support interoperation with voice telephones using G.711 speech coding, if the connected network supports transmission and reception of G.711. Other modes such as G.722 audio may optionally be supported as well.

H.324 was adapted by 3GPP to form 3G-324M.

It is for example used in the Vialta Beamer BM-80 Phone Video Station, the MINX system from Datapoint Corporation, and in several other videophones.

== See also ==
- H.320
- H.323
- Videoconferencing
- Videotelephony
