= Institut national de recherche en sciences et technologies pour l'environnement et l'agriculture =

French research institute

Coordinates: 48.7485°N 2.3164°E

The Institut national de recherche en sciences et technologies pour l'environnement et l'agriculture (French pronunciation: [ɛ̃stity nɑsjɔnal də ʁəʃɛʁʃ ɑ̃ sjɑ̃s e tɛknɔlɔʒi puʁ lɑ̃viʁɔnmɑ̃ e laɡʁikyltyʁ]; "National Institute of Scientific and Technological Research for Environment and Agriculture"; IRSTEA), formerly known as Cemagref, was a public research institute in France focusing on land management issues, such as water resources and agricultural technology. From 1 January 2020 the IRSTEA merged with the INRA (Institut national de la recherche agronomique) to create the INRAE (Institut national de recherche pour l'agriculture, l'alimentation et l'environnement).

== Organization ==
IRSTEA/Cemagref had an annual operating budget of €81.6 Million in 2011, and employed nearly 1350 staff, including 950 permanent staff, others being graduate students, 200 doctoral candidates, interns and foreign researchers. About 250 master-degree trainees contributed also to some of its activities.

There were 9 research sites containing a total of 29 research units. In addition to published research, the institute collaborates with other research organizations and took in a portion of its income from contract work.

IRSTEA is a member of the UniverSud Paris.

== Partner organizations ==
Irstea collaborated in a number of other research networks, including European Network of Freshwater Research Organisations (EurAqua), the Partnership for European Environmental Research (PEER), European network for testing of agricultural machines (ENTAM), and the European Network of Engineering for Agriculture and Environment (ENGAGE).
