= Multipoint control unit =

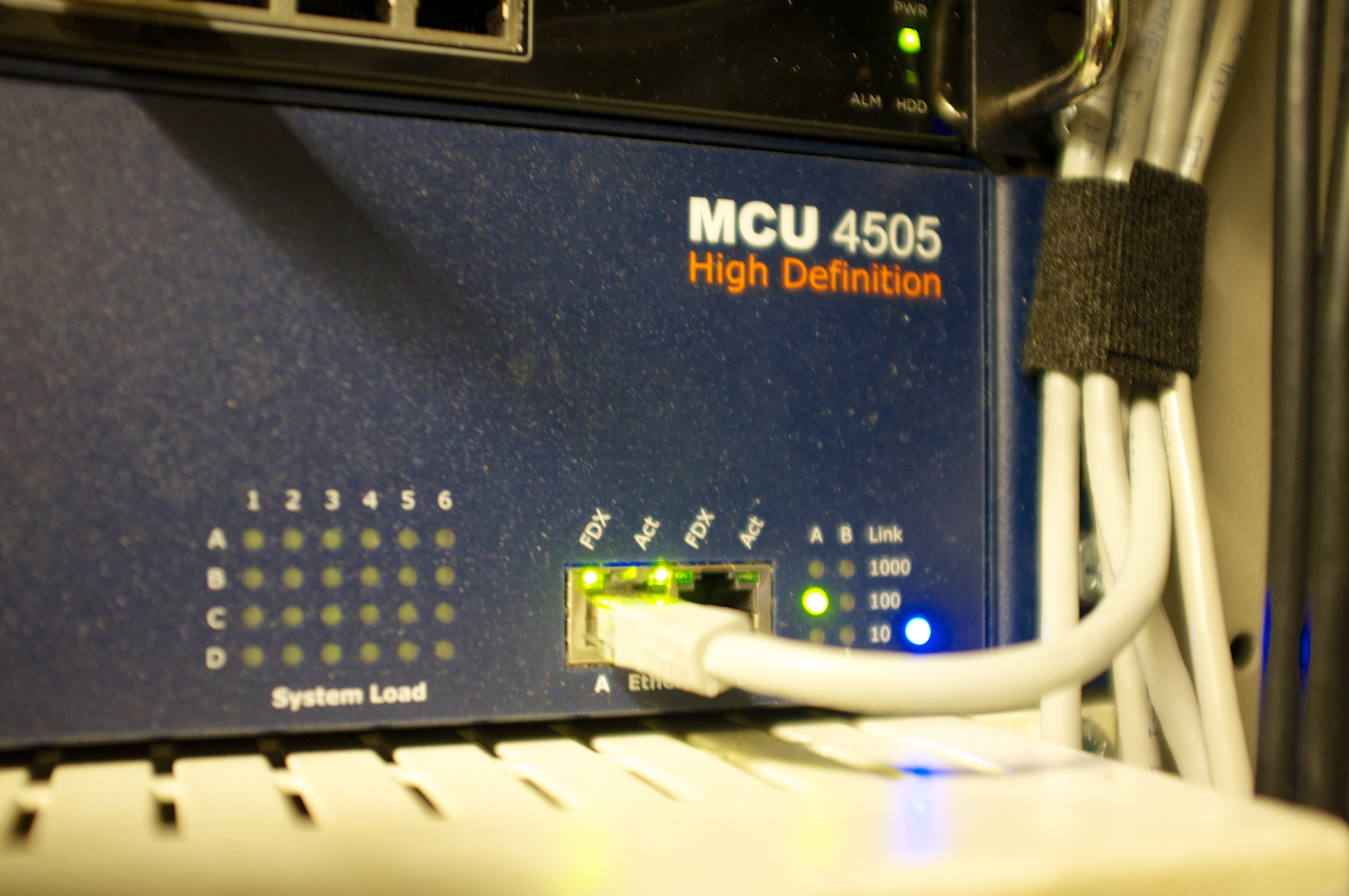
Cisco TelePresence MCU 4505.

A multipoint control unit (MCU) is a device commonly used to bridge videoconferencing connections. it connects several participants into one conference session.it acts like central hub of communication.

== See also ==
- H.323
