= H.245 =

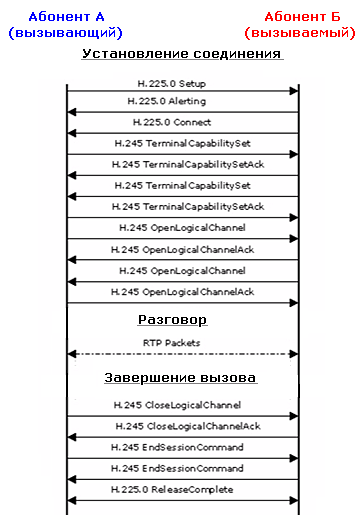
H323 call flow

H.245 is a control channel protocol used with[in] e.g. H.323 and H.324 communication sessions, and involves the line transmission of non-telephone signals. It also offers the possibility to be tunneled within H.225.0 call signaling messages. This eases firewall traversing.

H.245 is capable of conveying information needed for multimedia communication, such as encryption, flow control, jitter management, preference requests, as well as the opening and closing of logical channels used to carry media streams. It also defines separate send and receive capabilities and the means to send these details to other devices that support H.323.

== Handshake issues ==
One major drawback within the initial version of H.323 was the lengthy, four-way H.245 protocol handshake required during the opening up of the logical channels of a telephony session. Later versions of H.323 introduced the Fast Connect procedure, using the fastStart element of an H.225.0 message. Fast Connect brought the negotiation down to a two-way handshake. Another recommendation, H.460.6, Extended Fast Connect Feature, exists that defines a one-way handshake.
