= T.120 =

T.120 is a suite of point-to-multipoint communication protocols for teleconferencing, videoconferencing, and computer-supported collaboration. It provides for application sharing, online chat, file sharing, and other functions. The protocols are standardised by the ITU Telecommunication Standardization Sector (ITU-T).

T.120 has been implemented in various real-time collaboration programmes, including WebEx and NetMeeting. IBM Sametime switched from the T.120 protocols to HTTP(S) in version 8.5.

The prefix T designates the ITU subcommittee that developed the standard, but it is not an abbreviation. The ITU (re)assigns these prefixes to committees incrementally and in alphabetic order.

The T.123 standard specifies that T.120 protocols use network port 1503 when communicating over TCP/IP.

== Components ==
Number	Title	Status	Refs
T.120	Data protocols for multimedia conferencing	In force	
T.121	Generic application template	In force	
T.122	Multipoint communication service - Service definition	In force	
T.123	Network-specific data protocol stacks for multimedia conferencing	In force	
T.124	Generic Conference Control	In force	
T.125	Multipoint communication service protocol specification	In force	
T.126	Multipoint still image and annotation protocol	In force	
T.127	Multipoint binary file transfer protocol	In force	
T.128	Multipoint application sharing (Note: T.128 was previously called T.Share while in draft stage.)	In force	
T.130	Realtime architecture	?	
T.131	Network specific mappings	?	
T.132	Realtime link management	?	
T.133	Audio visual control services	?	
T.134	Text chat application entity	In force	
T.135	User-to-reservation system transactions within T.120 conferences	In force	
T.136	Remote device control application protocol	Superseded by H.281	
T.137	Virtual meeting room management for multimedia conferencing audio-visual control	In force	
T.RES	Reservation services	?	
T.TUD	User reservation	?	

== See also ==
- Interactive whiteboard
- Synchronous conferencing
- Videotelephony
- Web conferencing
