= H.323 Gatekeeper =

An H.323 Gatekeeper serves the purpose of Call Admission Control and translation services from E.164 IDs (commonly a phone number) to IP addresses in an H.323 telephony network. Gatekeepers can be combined with a gateway function to proxy H.323 calls and are sometimes referred to as session border controllers (SBC). A gatekeeper can also deny access or limit the number of simultaneous connections to prevent network congestion.

H.323 endpoints are not required to register with a gatekeeper to be able to place point to point calls, but they are essential for any serious H.323 network to control call prefix routing and link capacities among other functions.

A typical H.323 Gatekeeper call flow for a successful call may look like:-

   | |                           |  |
Endpoint A                    Endpoint B
  1234                           1123

1. Endpoint A dials 1123 from the system.
2. Endpoint A sends ARQ (Admission Request) to the Gatekeeper.
3. Gatekeeper returns ACF (Admission Confirmation) with IP address of endpoint B.
4. Endpoint A sends Q.931 call setup messages to endpoint B.
5. Endpoint B sends the Gatekeeper an ARQ, asking if it can answer call.
6. Gatekeeper returns an ACF with IP address of endpoint A.
7. Endpoint B answers and sends Q.931 call setup messages to endpoint A.
8. IRR sent to Gatekeeper from both endpoints.
9. Either endpoint disconnects the call by sending a DRQ (Disconnect Request) to the Gatekeeper.
10. Gatekeeper sends a DCF (Disconnect Confirmation) to both endpoints.

The gatekeeper allows calls to be placed either: Directly between endpoints (Direct Endpoint Model), or Route the call signaling through itself (Gatekeeper Routed Model).

== See also ==
- GNU Gatekeeper (GnuGK)

== Sources ==
- Cisco Technotes: Understanding H.323 Gatekeepers
- Microsoft TechNet: H.323 Gatekeeper
- Packetizer: A Primer on the H.323 Series Standard
