= Comparison of video codecs =

Α video codec is software or a device that provides encoding and decoding for digital video, and which may or may not include the use of video compression and/or decompression. Most codecs are typically implementations of video coding formats.

The compression may employ lossy data compression, so that quality-measurement issues become important. Shortly after the compact disc became widely available as a digital-format replacement for analog audio, it became feasible to also store and use video in digital form. A variety of technologies soon emerged to do so. The primary goal for most methods of compressing video is to produce video that most closely approximates the fidelity of the original source, while simultaneously delivering the smallest file-size possible. However, there are also several other factors that can be used as a basis for comparison.

== Introduction to comparison ==
The following characteristics are compared in video codecs comparisons:

- Video quality per bitrate (or range of bitrates). Commonly video quality is considered the main characteristic of codec comparisons. Video quality comparisons can be subjective or objective.
- Performance characteristics such as compression/decompression speed, supported profiles/options, supported resolutions, supported rate control strategies, etc.
- General software characteristics – for example:
  - Manufacturer
  - Supported OS (Linux, macOS, Windows)
  - Version number
  - Date of release
  - Type of license (commercial, free, open source)
  - Supported interfaces (VfW, DirectShow, etc.)
  - Price (value for money, volume discounts, etc.)

== Video quality ==
The quality the codec can achieve is heavily based on the compression format the codec uses. A codec is not a format, and there may be multiple codecs that implement the same compression specification – for example, MPEG-1 codecs typically do not achieve quality/size ratio comparable to codecs that implement the more modern H.264 specification. But quality/size ratio of output produced by different implementations of the same specification can also vary.

Each compression specification defines various mechanisms by which raw video (in essence, a sequence of full-resolution uncompressed digital images) can be reduced in size, from simple bit compression (like Lempel-Ziv-Welch) to psycho-visual and motion summarization, and how the output is stored as a bit stream. So long as the encoder component of the codec adheres to the specification, it can choose any combination of these methods to apply different parts of the content. The decoder component of a codec that also conforms to the specification recognizes each of the mechanisms used, and thus interprets the compressed stream to render it back into raw video for display (although this will not be identical to the raw video input unless the compression was lossless). Each encoder implements the specification according to its own algorithms and parameters, which means that the compressed output of different codecs will vary, resulting in variations in quality and efficiency between them.

Prior to comparing codec video-quality, it is important to understand that every codec can give a varying degree of quality for a given set of frames within a video sequence. Numerous factors play a role in this variability. First, all codecs have a bitrate control mechanism that is responsible for determining the bitrate and quality on a per-frame basis. A difference between variable bitrate (VBR) and constant bitrate (CBR) creates a trade-off between a consistent quality over all frames, on the one hand, and a more constant bitrate, which is required for some applications, on the other. Second, some codecs differentiate between different types of frames, such as key frames and non-key frames, differing in their importance to overall visual quality and the extent to which they can be compressed. Third, quality depends on prefiltrations, which are included on all present-day codecs. Other factors may also come into play.

For a sufficiently long clip, it is possible to select sequences that have suffered little from the compression, and sequences that have suffered heavily, especially if CBR has been used, whereby the quality between frames can vary highly due to different amounts of compression needed to achieve a constant bitrate. So, in a given long clip, such as a full-length movie, any two codecs may perform quite differently on a particular sequence from the clip, while the codecs may be approximately equal (or the situation reversed) in quality over a wider sequence of frames. Press-releases and amateur forums may sometimes select sequences known to favor a particular codec or style of rate-control in reviews.

=== Objective video quality ===
Objective video evaluation techniques are mathematical models that seek to predict human judgments of picture quality, as often exemplified by the results of subjective quality assessment experiments. They are based on criteria and metrics that can be measured objectively and automatically evaluated by a computer program. Objective methods are classified based on the availability of an original pristine video signal, which is considered to be of high quality (generally not compressed). Therefore, they can be classified as:

- Full reference methods (FR), where the whole original video signal is available
- Reduced reference methods (RR), where only partial information of the original video is available, and
- No-reference methods (NR), where the original video is not available at all.

=== Subjective video quality ===
This is concerned with how video is perceived by a viewer, and designates their opinion on a particular video sequence. Subjective video quality tests are quite expensive with regard to time (preparation and running) and human resources.

There are many ways of showing video sequences to experts and recording their opinions. A few of them have been standardized, mainly in ITU-R Recommendation BT.500-13 and ITU-T Recommendation P.910.

The reason for measuring subjective video quality is the same as for measuring the mean opinion score for audio. Opinions of experts can be averaged and the average mark stated as, or accompanied by, a given confidence interval. Additional procedures can be used for averaging. For example, experts whose opinions are considered unstable (such as if their correlation with average opinion is found to be low) may have their opinions rejected.

In the case of video codecs, this is a very common situation. When codecs with similar objective results show results with different subjective results, the main reasons can be:

- Pre- and postfilters are widely used in codecs. Codecs often use prefilters such as video denoising, deflicking, deshaking, etc. Denoising and deflicking normally maintain PSNR value while increasing visual quality (the best slow denoising filters also increase PSNR on medium and high bitrates). Deshaking greatly decreases PSNR, but increases visual quality. Postfilters show similar characteristics – deblocking and deringing maintain PSNR, but increase quality; graining (suggested in H.264) essentially increases video quality, especially on big plasma screens, but decreases PSNR. All filters increase compression/decompression time, so they enhance visual quality but decrease the speed of coding and decoding.
- Motion estimation (ME) search strategy can also cause different visual quality for the same PSNR. So-called true motion search commonly will not reach minimum sum of absolute differences (SAD) values in codec ME, but may result in better visual quality. Such methods also require more compression time.
- Rate control strategy. VBR commonly causes better visual quality marks than CBR for the same average PSNR values for sequences.

It is difficult to use long sequences for subjective testing. Commonly, three or four ten-second sequences are used, while full movies are used for objective metrics. Sequence selection is important – those sequences that are similar to the ones used by developers to tune their codecs are more competitive.

== Performance comparison ==
=== Speed comparison ===
Number of frames per second (FPS) commonly used for compression/decompression speed measurement.

The following issues should be considered when estimating probable codec performance differences:

- Decompression (sometimes compression) frame time uniformity – Big differences in this value can cause annoyingly jerky playback.
- SIMD support will vary by both processor and codec – e.g., MMX, SSE, SSE2, each of which changes CPU performance on some kinds of tasks (often including those with which codecs are concerned).
- Multi-threading support varies substantially by processor (the number of CPU cores), and codecs have different strategies for using those cores – the presence of Hyper-threading affects codec speed as it changes low-level resource allocation on the CPU.
- RAM speed – generally important for most codec implementations.
- Processor cache size – low values sometimes cause serious speed degradation, e.g., for CPUs with low caches such as several of the Intel Celeron series.
- GPU usage by codec – some codecs can drastically increase their performance by taking advantage of GPU resources.

So, for example, codec A (being optimized for memory usage – i.e., uses less memory) may, on modern computers (which are typically not memory-limited), give slower performance than codec B. Meanwhile, the same pair of codecs may give opposite results if running on an older computer with reduced memory (or cache) resources.

=== Profiles support ===
Modern standards define a wide range of features and require very substantial software or hardware efforts and resources for their implementation. Only selected profiles of a standard are typically supported in any particular product. (This is very common for H.264 implementations, for example.)

The H.264 standard includes the following seven sets of capabilities, which are referred to as profiles, targeting specific classes of applications:

- Baseline Profile (BP): Primarily for lower-cost applications with limited computing resources, this profile is used widely in videoconferencing and mobile applications.
- Main Profile (MP): Originally intended as the mainstream consumer profile for broadcast and storage applications, the importance of this profile faded when the High profile (HiP) was developed for those applications.
- Extended Profile (XP): Intended as the streaming video profile, this profile has relatively high compression capability and some extra tricks for robustness to data losses and server stream switching.
- High Profile (HiP): The primary profile for broadcast and disc storage applications, particularly for high-definition television applications. (This is the profile adopted into HD DVD and Blu-ray Disc, for example.)
- High 10 Profile (Hi10P): Going beyond today's mainstream consumer product capabilities, this profile builds on top of the High Profile, adding support for up to 10 bits per sample of decoded picture precision.
- High 4:2:2 Profile (Hi422P): Primarily targeting professional applications that use interlaced video, this profile builds on top of the High 10 Profile, adding support for the 4:2:2 chroma sampling format while using up to 10 bits per sample of decoded picture precision.
- High 4:4:4 Predictive Profile (Hi444PP): This profile builds on top of the High 4:2:2 Profile, supporting up to 4:4:4 chroma sampling, up to 14 bits per sample, and additionally supporting efficient lossless region coding and the coding of each picture as three separate color planes.
- Multiview High Profile: This profile supports two or more views using both inter-picture (temporal) and MVC inter-view prediction, but does not support field pictures and macroblock-adaptive frame-field coding.

The standard also contains four additional all-Intra profiles, which are defined as simple subsets of other corresponding profiles. These are mostly for professional (e.g., camera and editing system) applications:

- High 10 Intra Profile: The High 10 Profile constrained to all-Intra use.
- High 4:2:2 Intra Profile: The High 4:2:2 Profile constrained to all-Intra use.
- High 4:4:4 Intra Profile: The High 4:4:4 Profile constrained to all-Intra use.
- CAVLC 4:4:4 Intra Profile: The High 4:4:4 Profile constrained to all-Intra use and to CAVLC entropy coding (i.e., not supporting CABAC).

Moreover, the standard now also contains three Scalable Video Coding profiles.

- Scalable Baseline Profile: A scalable extension of the Baseline profile.
- Scalable High Profile: A scalable extension of the High profile.
- Scalable High Intra Profile: The Scalable High Profile constrained to all-Intra use.

An accurate comparison of codecs must take the profile variations within each codec into account.

See also MPEG-2 Profiles and Levels.

=== Supported rate control strategies ===
Videocodecs' rate control strategies can be classified as:

- Variable bitrate (VBR) and
- Constant bitrate (CBR).

Variable bitrate (VBR) is a strategy to maximize the visual video quality and minimize the bitrate. On fast-motion scenes, a variable bitrate uses more bits than it does on slow-motion scenes of similar duration, yet achieves a consistent visual quality. For real-time and non-buffered video streaming when the available bandwidth is fixed – e.g., in videoconferencing delivered on channels of fixed bandwidth – a constant bitrate (CBR) must be used.

CBR is commonly used for videoconferences, satellite and cable broadcasting. VBR is commonly used for video CD/DVD creation and video in programs.

Bit rate control is suited to video streaming. For offline storage and viewing, it is typically preferable to encode at constant quality (usually defined by quantization) rather than using bit rate control.

== Software characteristics ==
=== Codecs list ===
General video codec information – creator/company, license/price, etc.
Codec	Creator/Maintainer	First public release date	Latest stable version	License	Patented compression formats	Compression method	Basic algorithm	OpenCL support	nVidia CUDA support	Intel SSE Support	Intel AVX support	Intel Quick Sync Video support
AOM Video 1 (AV1)	Alliance for Open Media	2018-06-25	1.0.0 Errata 1 (2019)	2-clause BSD	Patented, but freely licensed	Lossy / Lossless	DCT	Unknown	Unknown	Yes	Yes	Yes
libtheora (Theora)	Xiph.org	2002-09-25	1.1.1 (2009)	BSD-style	Patented, but freely licensed^{[*]}	Lossy	DCT	Unknown	Unknown	Yes	No	Unknown
dirac-research (Dirac)	BBC Research Department	2008-09-17	1.0.2 (2009)	MPL 1.1, GNU GPL 2, GNU LGPL 2.1	none	Lossy / Lossless	DWT	Unknown	Unknown	Unknown	No	Unknown
CineForm	GoPro	2001	10.0.2 (2019)	Apache License 2.0, MIT License	none	Lossy	DWT	No	No	Yes	No	No
Schrödinger (Dirac)	David Schleef	2008-02-22	1.0.11 (2012)	MPL 1.1, GNU GPL 2, GNU LGPL 2, MIT License	none	Lossy / Lossless	DWT	Yes	Yes	Unknown	Unknown	Unknown
x264	x264 team	2003	r3079 (2021)	GNU GPL	MPEG-4 AVC/H.264	Lossy / Lossless	DCT	Yes	No	Yes	Yes	Yes
x265	x265 team	2013	3.5 (2021)	GNU GPL	HEVC/H.265	Lossy / Lossless	DCT	No	No	Yes	Yes	Yes
Xvid	Xvid team	2001	1.3.7 (2019)	GNU GPL	MPEG-4 ASP	Lossy	DCT	Unknown	Unknown	Unknown	Unknown	Unknown
FFmpeg (libavcodec)	FFmpeg team	2000	4.4.1 (2021)	GNU LGPL	MPEG-1, MPEG-2, MPEG-4 ASP, H.261, H.263, VC-3, WMV7, WMV8, MJPEG, MS-MPEG-4v3, DV, Sorenson codec, etc.	Lossy / Lossless	DCT	Yes	Yes	Yes	Yes	Yes
FFavs (libavcodec)	FFavs team	2009	0.0.3 (2009)	GNU LGPL	MPEG-1, MPEG-2, MPEG-4 ASP, etc.	Lossy / Lossless	DCT	Unknown	Unknown	Unknown	Unknown	Unknown
OpenH264	Cisco Systems	2014-05	2.1.1 (2020)	2-clause BSD	MPEG-4 AVC/H.264	Lossy	DCT	No	No	Yes	No	No
Blackbird	Forbidden Technologies plc	2006-01	9 (2017)	Proprietary	Blackbird	Lossy	Adaptive coding	Unknown	Unknown	Unknown	Unknown	Unknown
DivX	DivX, Inc.	2001	DivX Software 11 (2024)	Proprietary	MPEG-4 ASP, H.264	Lossy	DCT	Unknown	Unknown	Unknown	Unknown	Yes
DivX ;-)	a hack of Microsoft's MPEG-4v3 codec	1998	3.20 alpha (2000)	Proprietary	Microsoft's MPEG-4v3 (not MPEG-4 compliant)	Lossy	DCT	Unknown	Unknown	Unknown	Unknown	Unknown
3ivx	3ivx Technologies Pty. Ltd.	2001	5.0.5 (2012)	Proprietary	MPEG-4 ASP	Lossy	DCT	Unknown	Unknown	Unknown	Unknown	Unknown
Nero Digital	Nero AG	2003	1.5.4.0 (2010)	Proprietary	MPEG-4 ASP, H.264	Lossy	DCT	Unknown	Unknown	Unknown	Unknown	Unknown
ProRes 422 / ProRes 4444	Apple Inc.	2007	Unknown	Proprietary	ProRes	Lossy	DCT	Unknown	Unknown	Unknown	Unknown	Unknown
Sorenson Video	Sorenson Media	1998	Unknown	Proprietary	Sorenson Video	Lossy	DCT	Unknown	Unknown	Unknown	Unknown	Unknown
Sorenson Spark	Sorenson Media	2002	Unknown	Proprietary	Sorenson Spark	Lossy	DCT	Unknown	Unknown	Unknown	Unknown	Unknown
VP3	On2 Technologies	2000	Unknown	BSD-style	Patented, but freely licensed^{[*]}	Lossy	DCT	Unknown	Unknown	Unknown	Unknown	Unknown
VP4	On2 Technologies	2001	Unknown	Proprietary	VP4	Lossy	DCT	Unknown	Unknown	Unknown	Unknown	Unknown
VP5	On2 Technologies	2002	Unknown	Proprietary	VP5	Lossy	DCT	Unknown	Unknown	Unknown	Unknown	Unknown
VP6	On2 Technologies	2003	Unknown	Proprietary	VP6	Lossy	DCT	Unknown	Unknown	Unknown	Unknown	Unknown
VP7	On2 Technologies	2005	Unknown	Proprietary	VP7	Lossy	DCT	Unknown	Unknown	Unknown	Unknown	Unknown
libvpx (VP8)	On2 Technologies (now owned by Google)	2008	1.11.0 (2021)	BSD-style	Patented, but freely licensed	Lossy	DCT	Unknown	Unknown	Unknown	Unknown	Unknown
libvpx (VP9)	Google	2013	1.11.0 (2021)	BSD-style	Patented, but freely licensed	Lossy / Lossless	DCT	Yes, not in libvpx but in proprietary VP9 OpenCL codecs by Luxoft and Ittiam	Unknown	Unknown	Unknown	Unknown
DNxHD	Avid Technology	2004	Unknown	Proprietary	VC-3	Lossy	DCT	Unknown	Unknown	Unknown	Unknown	Unknown
Cinema Craft Encoder SP2	Custom Technology Corporation	2000	1.00.01.09 (2009)	Proprietary	MPEG-1, MPEG-2	Lossy	DCT	Unknown	Unknown	Unknown	Unknown	Unknown
TMPGEnc Free Version	Pegasys Inc.	2001	2.525.64.184 (2008)	Proprietary	MPEG-1, MPEG-2	Lossy	DCT	Unknown	Unknown	Unknown	Unknown	Unknown
Windows Media Encoder	Microsoft	1999	9 (2003) (WMV3 in FourCC)	Proprietary	WMV, VC-1, (in early versions MPEG-4 Part 2 and not MPEG-4 compliant MPEG-4v3, MPEG-4v2)	Lossy	DCT	Unknown	Unknown	Unknown	Unknown	Unknown
Cinepak	Created by SuperMac, Inc., acquired and patented by Radius, Inc. Currently maintained by Compression Technologies, Inc.	1991	1.10.0.26 (1999)	Proprietary	Cinepak	Lossy	VQ	Unknown	Unknown	Unknown	Unknown	Unknown
Indeo Video	Intel Corporation, currently offered by Ligos Corporation	1992	5.11	Proprietary	Indeo Video	Lossy	DCT	Unknown	Unknown	Unknown	Unknown	Unknown
TrueMotion S	On2 Technologies	1995	Unknown	Proprietary	TrueMotion S	Lossy	Intra-frame coding	Unknown	Unknown	Unknown	Unknown	Unknown
RealVideo	RealNetworks	1997	RealVideo 10	Proprietary	H.263, RealVideo	Lossy	DCT	Unknown	Unknown	Unknown	Unknown	Unknown
Huffyuv	Ben Rudiak-Gould	2000	2.1.1 (2003)	GNU GPL 2	none	Lossless	Huffman	Unknown	Unknown	Unknown	Unknown	Unknown
Lagarith	Ben Greenwood	2004-10-04	1.3.27 (2011-12-08)	GNU GPL 2	none	Lossless	Huffman	Unknown	Unknown	Unknown	Unknown	Unknown
MainConcept	MainConcept GmbH	1993	8.8.0 (2011)	Proprietary	MPEG-1, MPEG-2, H.264/AVC, H.263, VC-3, MPEG-4 Part 2, DV, MJPEG etc.	Lossy	DCT	Yes	Yes	Unknown	Unknown	Yes
CellB Video Encoding	Sun Microsystems	1992		BSD-style	none	Lossy	VQ	Unknown	Unknown	Unknown	Unknown	Unknown
Elecard	Elecard	2008	G4 (2010)	Proprietary	MPEG-1, MPEG-2, MPEG-4, AVC	Lossy	DCT	No	Yes	No	Yes	Yes
Codec	Creator/Maintainer	First public release date	Latest stable version	License	Patented compression formats	Compression method	Basic algorithm	OpenCL support	nVidia CUDA support	Intel SSE Support	Intel AVX support	Intel Quick Sync Video support

^{*} The Xiph.Org Foundation has negotiated an irrevocable free license to Theora and other VP3-derived codecs for everyone, for any purpose. ^{*} DivX Plus is also known as DivX 8. The latest stable version for Mac is DivX 7 for Mac.

=== Native operating system support ===
Note that operating system support does not mean whether video encoded with the codec can be played back on the particular operating system – for example, video encoded with the DivX codec is playable on Unix-like systems using free MPEG-4 ASP decoders (FFmpeg MPEG-4 or Xvid), but the DivX codec (which is a software product) is only available for Windows and macOS.

Encoder Operating System Support
Codec	macOS	other Unix & Unix-like	Windows
3ivx	Yes	Yes	Yes
Blackbird	Yes	Yes	Yes
Cinepak	Yes	No	Yes
DivX	Yes	No	Yes
FFmpeg	Yes	Yes	Yes
RealVideo	Yes	Yes	Yes
Schrödinger (Dirac)	Yes	Yes	Yes
Sorenson Video 3	Yes	No	Yes
Theora	Yes	Yes	Yes
x264	Yes	Yes	Yes
Xvid	Yes	Yes	Yes
Elecard	Yes	No	Yes

=== Technical details ===
Codec	Compression type	Basic algorithm	Highest supported bitrate	Highest supported resolution	Variable frame rate
Blackbird	Lossy compression	Unknown	Unknown	384×288 (PAL), 320×240 (NTSC)	Yes
Cinepak	Lossy compression	Vector quantization	Unknown	Unknown	Unknown
Dirac	Lossy / Lossless compression	Wavelet compression	Unlimited	Unlimited	Yes
Sorenson 3	Lossy compression	Discrete cosine transform	Unknown	Unknown	Unknown
Theora	Lossy compression	Discrete cosine transform	2 Gibit/s	1,048,560×1,048,560	Via chaining^{[*]}
RealVideo	Lossy compression	Discrete cosine transform	Unknown	Unknown	Yes
Elecard	Lossy compression	Unknown	Unlimited	16k	Yes

^{*} Theora streams with different frame rates can be chained in the same file, but each stream has a fixed frame rate.

== Freely available codecs comparisons ==
List of freely available comparisons and their content description:

Name of comparison	Type of comparison	Date(s) of publication	List of compared codecs	Comments
Series of Doom9 codec comparisons	Series of subjective comparison of popular codecs	2002; 2003; 2005	DivX4.12, On2 VP3, XviD 1/25 and WMV8 and DivX5.01, XviD 3/27 and ON2 VP4 – at first version; Dirac, Elecard AVC HP, libavcodec MPEG-4, NeroDigital ASP, QuickTime 7, Snow, Theora, VideoSoft H.264 HP, XviD 1.1 beta 2 – in last one	Subjective comparison with convenient visualization
Series of MSU annual video codecs comparisons	Series of objective HEVC/AV1 codecs comparisons	2015 Oct.; 2016 Aug.; 2017 Sept.; 2018 Sept.	2015: f265 H.265 Encoder, Intel MSS HEVC GAcc, Intel MSS HEVC Software, Ittiam HEVC Hardware Encoder, Ittiam HEVC Software Encoder, Strongene Lentoid HEVC Encoder, SHBP H.265 Real time encoder, x265, InTeleMax TurboEnc, SIF Encoder, VP9 Video Codec, x264; 2016: Chips&Media HEVC Encoder, Intel MSS HEVC Encoder, Kingsoft HEVC Encoder, nj265, SHBPH.265 Real time encoder, x265, nj264, x264; 2017: Kingsoft HEVC Encoder, nj265, NVIDIA NVENC SDK, Telecast, x265, AV1, nj264, SIF encoder, uAVS2, VP9, x264; 2018: HW265, Intel MFX (GA), Intel MFX (SW), Kingsoft HEVC Encoder, sz265, Tencent Shannon Encoder, UC265, VITEC HEVC GEN2+, x265, AV1, SIF encoder, sz264, VP9, x264	Detailed objective comparisons
Series of MSU annual H.264 codecs comparisons	Series of objective H.264 codecs comparisons with MPEG-4 ASP reference	2004; 2005 Jan.; 2005 Dec.; 2006 Dec.; 2007 Dec.; 2009 May; 2010 Apr.; 2011 May; 2012 May; 2013 Dec.	2005 (Jan.): Mpegable AVC, Moonlight H.264, MainConcept H.264, Fraunhofer IIS, Ateme MPEG-4 AVC/H.264, Videosoft H.264, DivX Pro 5.1.1 (Not 264! Used for comparison with H.264 codecs as well tuned codec from previous generation MPEG-4 ASP); 2005 (Dec.): DivX 6.0 (MPEG-4 ASP reference), ArcSoft H.264, Ateme H.264, ATI H.264, Elecard H.264, Fraunhofer IIS H.264, VSS H.264, x264; 2006: DivX 6.2.5 (MPEG-4 ASP reference), MainConcept H.264, Intel H.264, VSS H.264, x264, Apple H.264, (partially), Sorenson H.264 (partially); 2007: XviD (MPEG-4 ASP codec), MainConcept H.264, Intel H.264, x264, AMD H.264, Artemis H.264; 2009: XviD (MPEG-4 ASP codec), Dicas H.264, Elecard H.264, Intel IPP H.264, MainConcept H.264, x264; 2010: XviD (MPEG-4 ASP codec), DivX H.264, Elecard H.264, Intel MediaSDK AVC/H.264, MainConcept H.264, Microsoft Expression, Encoder, Theora, x264; 2011: DivX H.264, Elecard H.264, Intel SandyBridge Transcoder (GPU encoder), MainConcept H.264 (software), MainConcept H.264 (CUDA based encoder), Microsoft Expression Encoder, DiscretePhoton, x264, VP8 (WebM project), XviD (MPEG-4 ASP codec); 2012: DivX H.264, Elecard H.264, Intel Ivy Bridge QuickSync (GPU encoder), MainConcept H.264 (software), MainConcept H.264 (CUDA based encoder), MainConcept H.264 (OpenCL based encoder), DiscretePhoton, x264, XviD (MPEG-4 ASP codec)	Detailed objective comparisons
Series of Lossless Video Codecs Comparison	Two size and time comparisons of lossless codecs (with lossless checking)	2004 Oct.; 2007 Mar.	2004 (14 codecs): Alpary v2.0, AVIzlib v2.2.3, CamStudio GZIP v1.0, CorePNG v0.8.2, FFV1 ffdshow 08/08/04, GLZW v1.01, HuffYUV v2.1.1, Lagarith v1.0.0.1, LEAD JPEG v1.0.0.1, LOCO v0.2, MindVid v1.0 beta 1, MSUlab beta v0.2.4, MSUlab v0.5.2, PicVideo JPEG v.2.10.0.29, VBLE beta; 2007 (16 codecs): Alpary, ArithYuv, AVIzlib, CamStudio GZIP, CorePNG, FastCodec, FFV1, Huffyuv, Lagarith, LOCO, LZO, MSU Lab, PICVideo, Snow, x264, YULS	in 2007 – more detailed report with new codecs including first standard H.264 (x264)
MSU MPEG-4 codecs comparison	Objective comparison of MPEG-4 codecs	2005 Mar.	DivX 5.2.1, DivX 4.12, DivX 3.22, MS MPEG-4 3688 v3, XviD 1.0.3, 3ivx D4 4.5.1, OpenDivX 0.3	Different versions of DivX were also compared. The Xvid results may be erroneous, as deblocking was disabled for it while used for DivX.
Subjective Comparison of Modern Video Codecs	Scientifically accurate subjective comparison using 50 experts and SAMVIQ methodology	2006 Feb.	DivX 6.0, Xvid 1.1.0, x264, WMV 9.0 (2 bitrates for every codec)	PSNR via VQM via SSIM comparison was also done
MPEG-2 Video Decoders Comparison	Objective MPEG-2 Decoders comparison	2006 May.	bitcontrol MPEG-2 Video Decoder, DScaler MPEG2 Video Decoder, Elecard MPEG-2 Video Decoder, ffdshow MPEG-4 Video Decoder (libavcodec), InterVideo Video Decoder, Ligos MPEG Video Decoder, MainConcept MPEG Video Decoder, Pinnacle MPEG-2 Decoder	Objectly tested (100 times per stream) decoders "crash test" (test on damaged stream – like scratched DVD or satellite samples)
Codecs comparison	Personal subjective opinion	2003 Nov.	3ivx, Avid AVI 2.02, Cinepak, DivX 3.11, DivX 4.12, DivX 5.0.2, DV, Huffyuv, Indeo 3.2, Indeo 4.4, Indeo 5.10, Microsoft MPEG-4 v1, Microsoft MPEG-4 v2, Microsoft RLE, Microsoft Video 1, XviD, 3ivx, Animation, Blackmagic 10-bit, Blackmagic 8-bit, Cinepak, DV, H.261, H.263, Motion-JPEG, MPEG-4 Video, PNG, Sorenson Video, Sorenson Video 3	Sometimes comparison is short (up to one text line per codec)
Evaluation of Dirac and Theora	Scientific paper	2009 Mar.	Dirac, Dirac Pro, Theora I, H.264, Motion JPEG2000 (the tested codecs are from Q2-2008)	Quite detailed comparison of software available in Q2-2008; However, a buggy version of ffmpeg2Theora was used
VP8 versus x264	Objective and subjective quality comparison of VP8 and x264	2010 Jun.	VP8, x264	VQM, SSIM and PSNR for 19 CIF video clips with bitrates of 100, 200, 500 and 1000 kbit/s

== See also ==
- Comparison of video player software
- List of codecs
  - List of open-source codecs
- Structural similarity
- MOVIE Index
- Comparison of audio coding formats
- Comparison of video container formats
- Comparison of video editing software
