= List of open-source codecs =

This is a listing of open-source codecs—that is, open-source software implementations of audio or video coding formats, audio codecs and video codecs respectively. Many of the codecs listed implement media formats that are restricted by patents and are hence not open formats. For example, x264 is a widely used open source implementation of the heavily patent encumbered MPEG-4 AVC video compression standard.

== Video codecs ==
- x264 and x265 – H.264/MPEG-4 AVC and High Efficiency Video Coding (HEVC/H.265) implementation. x264 or x265 is not any codec (encoder/decoder); it is just an encoder (it cannot decode video).
- OpenH264 – H.264 baseline profile encoding and decoding
- OpenVVC an VVC /H.266 Real Time-Decoder for Mac OS, Windows, Linux and Android and special Version of FFmpeg, which was used for Ateme Satellite Broadcast Test.
- Xvid – MPEG-4 Part 2 codec, compatible with DivX
- libvpx – VP8 and VP9 implementation; formerly a proprietary codec developed by On2 Technologies, released by Google under a BSD-like license in May 2010.
- SVT-AV1 – An AV1 encoder originally developed by Intel and Netflix, which is available as FOSS now. SVT-AV1 is generally considered to be the most optimized and fastest free AV1 encoder, which is why it serves as the base for the development of new, free, general-purpose and production-ready implementations in the AOMedia Software Implementation Working Group. While SVT-AV1 already performs very well in constrained quality mode and is economically usable for many scenarios, as of the time being commercial implementations like Aurora1 may still beat it.
- VideoLAN dav1d – An AV1 decoder for decoding videos with AV1 codec
- Xiph.Org rav1e – An AV1 encoder written in Rust
- Google libgav1 – An AV1 decoder by Google
- xvc – An open source video codec, aiming to compete with h.265 and AV1. The reference implementation is released under the LGPL 2.1 and currently available in version 2.0 (as of 12/2020)
- FFmpeg codecs – Codecs in the libavcodec library from the FFmpeg project (FFV1, Snow, MPEG-1, MPEG-2, MPEG-4 part 2, MSMPEG-4, WMV2, SVQ1, MJPEG, HuffYUV and others). Decoders in the libavcodec (H.264, SVQ3, WMV3, VP3, Theora, Indeo, Dirac, Lagarith and others).
- Lagarith – Video codec designed for strong lossless compression in RGB(A) colorspace (similar to ZIP/RAR/etc.)
- libtheora – A reference implementation of the Theora format, based on VP3, part of the Ogg Project
- Dirac as dirac-research, a wavelet based codec created by the BBC Research, and Schrödinger, an implementation developed by David Schleef.
- Huffyuv – Lossless codec from BenRG
- Daala – Experimental Video codec which was under development by the Xiph.Org Foundation and finally merged into AV1.
- Thor – Experimental royalty free video codec which was under development by Cisco Systems, and merged technologies into AV1.
- Turing – A High Efficiency Video Coding (HEVC/H.265) encoder implemented by BBC Research.
- libaom – Reference implementation for the royalty free AV1 video coding format by AOMedia, inheriting technologies from VP9, Daala and Thor.
- Kvazaar – An academic open-source encoder based on the High Efficiency Video Coding (HEVC/H.265) standard.
- UVG266 academic open-source VVC/H.266 encoder based on Kvazaar. (on 3 Clause BSD License for Linux/Windows/macOS, and in Development)
- VVenC & VVdeC – An open-source encoder and decoder released by Fraunhofer HHI based on the Versatile Video Coding (VVC/H.266) standard available on GitHub.
- XEVE (the eXtra-fast Essential Video Encoder) MPEG-5 Part 1: Essential Video Coding
- XEVD (the eXtra-fast Essential Video Decoder) MPEG-5 Part 1: Essential Video Coding
- REVC – a Rust-based MPEG-5 Part 1: Essential Video Coding baseline encoder and decoder.

== Audio codecs ==
- FLAC – Lossless codec developed by Xiph.Org Foundation.
- LAME – Lossy compression (MP3 format).
- TooLAME/TwoLAME – Lossy compression (MP2 format).
- Musepack – Lossy compression; based on MP2 format, with many improvements.
- Speex – Low bitrate compression, primarily voice; developed by Xiph.Org Foundation. Deprecated in favour of Opus according to www.speex.org.
- CELT – Lossy compression for low-latency audio communication
- libopus – A reference implementation of the Opus format, the IETF standards-track successor to CELT. (Opus support is mandatory for WebRTC implementations.)
- libvorbis – Lossy compression, implementation of the Vorbis format; developed by Xiph.Org Foundation.
- iLBC – Low bitrate compression, primarily voice
- iSAC – Low bitrate compression, primarily voice; (free when using the WebRTC codebase)
- TTA – Lossless compression
- WavPack – Hybrid lossy/lossless
- Bonk – Hybrid lossy/lossless; supported by fre:ac (formerly BonkEnc)
- Apple Lossless – Lossless compression (MP4)
- Fraunhofer FDK AAC – Lossy compression (AAC)
- FFmpeg codecs in the libavcodec library, e.g. AC-3, AAC, ADPCM, PCM, Apple Lossless, FLAC, WMA, Vorbis, MP2, etc.
- FAAD2 – open-source decoder for Advanced Audio Coding. There is also FAAC, the same project's encoder, but it is proprietary (but still free of charge).
- libgsm – Lossy compression (GSM 06.10)
- opencore-amr – Lossy compression (AMR and AMR-WB)
- liba52 – a free ATSC A/52 stream decoder (AC-3)
- libdca – a free DTS Coherent Acoustics decoder
- Codec2 – Low bitrate compression, primarily voice
- OAC – A versatile codec designed to replace Opus, suitable for all applications, from low-bitrate to high-fidelity, currently under development by the Alliance for Open Media.

== See also ==
- List of codecs
  - Comparison of video codecs
  - Comparison of audio coding formats
- Comparison of video player software
- Comparison of audio player software
- Open file format
