= Avidemux =

Free and open-source transcoding and video editing software

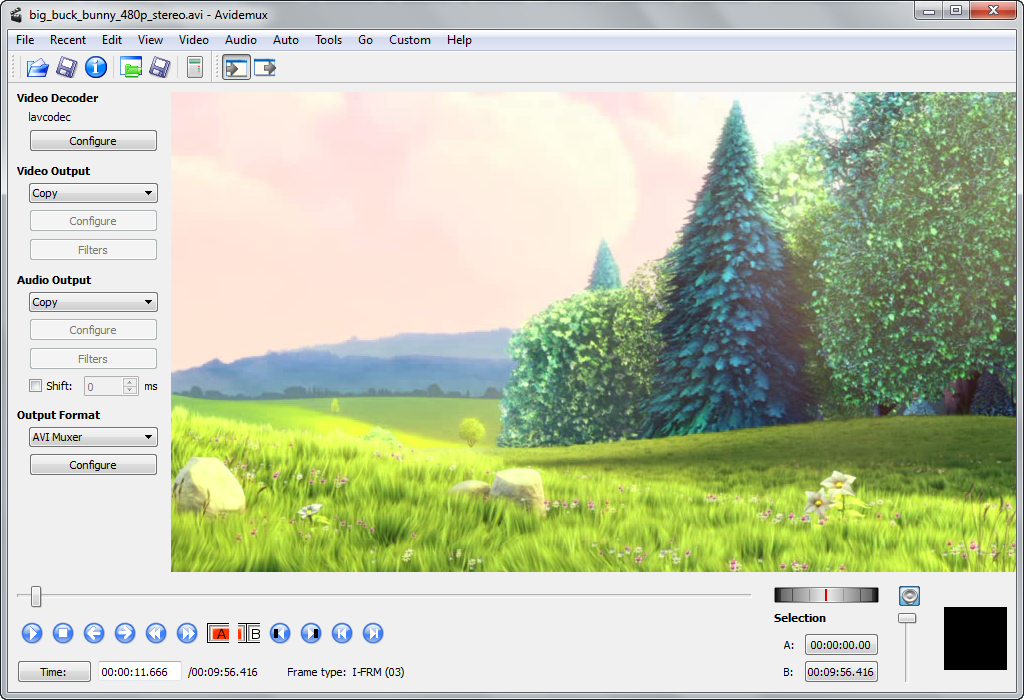
- Avidemux main window
- Developers: "Mean", "fahadu" and "Fahr"
- Stable release: 2.8.1 / 21 September 2022
- Preview release: None [±]
- Written in: C++
- Operating system: Windows, macOS, Linux, BSD
- Platform: IA-32, x86-64
- Available in: English, Czech, French, Italian, German
- Type: Video editing software
- License: GPL 2.0 or later
- Website: www.avidemux.org
- Repository: github.com/mean00/avidemux2

Avidemux is an application for non-linear video editing and transcoding multimedia files. The developers intend it as "a simple tool for simple video processing tasks" and to allow users "to do elementary things in a very straightforward way". It is written in C++ and uses Qt for its graphical user interface (GUI), and FFmpeg for its multimedia functions. Since version 2.4, it has two user interfaces: a GUI and a command-line interface. Since version 2.6, the original GTK port has been unmaintained and is now discontinued. It is free and open-source software released with a GNU General Public License 2.0 or later.

Avidemux is developed for Linux, macOS, and Windows. Unofficial builds exist for FreeBSD, NetBSD, and OpenBSD.

== Features ==
Avidemux is capable of non-linear video editing, applying visual effects (called Filters in Avidemux) to video, and transcoding video into various formats. Some of the filters were ported from MPlayer and Avisynth. Avidemux can so insert audio streams into a video file (an action known as multiplexing or muxing) or extract audio streams from video files (an action known as "demuxing").

An integral and important part of the design of the program is its project system, which uses the SpiderMonkey JavaScript engine. Whole projects with all options, configurations, selections, and preferences can be saved into a project file. Like VirtualDub's VCF scripting abilities, Avidemux has advanced scripting available for it in GUI and command line interfaces. It supports a non-project system like VirtualDub, which allows simply creating all user configurations and saving a video directly without making a project file. A project queue system is available.

Avidemux has built-in subtitle processing, both for optical character recognition of DVD subtitles and for rendering hard subtitles. It supports various subtitle formats, including MicroDVD (.SUB), SubStation Alpha (.SSA), Advanced SubStation Alpha (.ASS) and SubRip (.SRT).

=== Components ===
Avidemux was written from scratch, but code from FFmpeg, MPlayer, Transcode, and Avisynth has been added on occasion. It is a standalone program that needs no other programs to read, decode, or encode. The built-in libavcodec library from the FFmpeg project is used to decode and encode various audio and video formats, such as MPEG-4 ASP.

The primary (though not the only) Avidemux programmer uses the nickname 'Mean' on the Avidemux forum.

=== Multithreading ===
Multithreading is implemented in the following areas of Avidemux (some partially via libavcodec):

- Encoding
  - MPEG-1 and MPEG-2 (using libavcodec)
  - MPEG-4 Part 2 SP/ASP (using libavcodec or Xvid)
    - Earlier versions of Xvid are not compatible with this feature.
  - H.264/MPEG-4 Part 10 AVC (using x264)
  - H.265/HEVC (using x265)
- Decoding
  - MPEG-1 and MPEG-2 (using libavcodec)
  - MPEG-4 Part 2 SP/ASP (using libavcodec)

=== Supported formats ===
Avidemux supports following file formats:

Multimedia container formats
Name	File extension	As input	As output
Audio Video Interleave	.AVI	Yes	Yes
Advanced Systems Format	.ASF, .WMV and .WMA	Yes	No
Flash Video	.FLV	Yes	Yes
Matroska	.MKV	Yes	Yes
MPEG elementary stream	—N/a	Yes	No
MPEG program stream	.MPG and .MPEG	Yes	Yes (Note: Can create files that are compatible with Video CD, SVCD or DVD Video)
MPEG transport stream	.TS	Yes	Yes
MPEG-4 Part 14	.MP4	Yes	Yes
NuppelVideo	.NUV	Yes	No
OGM	.OGM	Yes	Yes
QuickTime	.MOV	Yes	No
3GP	.3GP	Yes	No
DVD-Video	.VOB	Yes	Yes
WebM	.WebM	Yes	Yes

Video formats
Name	As input	As output
AV1	Yes (Note: Using libaom)	No
Cinepak	Yes	No
DV	Yes	Yes
FFV1	Yes	Yes
H.263	Yes	Yes
H.264/MPEG-4 Part 10 AVC	Yes	Yes (Note: Using x264)
H.265/HEVC	Yes	Yes (Note: Using x265)
HuffYUV	Yes	Yes
MPEG-1	Yes	Yes
MPEG-2	Yes	Yes
MPEG-4 Part 2 (Note: Both Simple Profile and Advanced Simple Profile)	Yes (Note: Supported codec FourCCs: DIVX, DX50, XVID, FMP4, M4S2)	Yes (Note: Using FFmpeg or Xvid)
Motion JPEG	Yes	Yes
MSMPEG-4 v2 (Note: FourCC: DIV3)	Yes	No
Raw video – RGB	Yes	No
Raw video – YV12	Yes	Yes
Snow	No	Yes
Sorenson Video 3 (SVQ3)	Yes	Yes
VC-1 (Note: FourCC: WMV3)	Yes	No
VP3	Yes	No
VP6	Yes (Note: Through libavcodec)	No
VP8	Yes	No
VP9	Yes	Yes (Note: Using Libvpx)
Windows Media Video 8 (Note: FourCC: WMV2)	Yes	No
Y800	Yes	Yes

Audio formats
Name	As input	As output
Adaptive Multi-Rate – Narrow Band (AMR-NB)	Yes	No
Advanced Audio Coding (AAC)	Yes	Yes
AC-3	Yes	Yes
DTS	Yes	No
Linear pulse-code modulation (LPCM)	No	Yes
MP2	Yes	Yes
MP3	Yes	Yes
Opus	Yes	Yes
Pulse-code modulation (PCM)	No	Yes
Vorbis	Yes	Yes
TrueHD	Yes	No

Image formats
Name	File extension	As input	As output
Windows bitmap	.BMP	Yes	Yes single frame only
JPEG	.JPG and .JPEG	Yes	Yes
PNG	.PNG	Yes	Yes single frame only

== See also ==
- List of video editing software
- Comparison of video editing software
- Comparison of video converters
