= High-definition pre-recorded media and compression =

The first attempt at producing pre-recorded HDTV media was a scarce Japanese analog MUSE-encoded laser disc which is no longer produced (see MUSE-LD).

In the U.S. market, the first currently available prerecorded HD media was D-Theater. Comprising less than 100 titles and utilizing a 28-Mbit/s MPEG2 stream at 720p or 1080i with either Dolby Digital 5.1 or DTS encoding, D-Theater is an encrypted D-VHS format, and only D-Theater-capable D-VHS players can play back these tapes. This format is superior to broadcast HDTV due to its higher bandwidth and, of course, the ability to do non-realtime optimization of the encoding, which is not possible with broadcast HDTV. D-Theater is currently a small niche market even within the niche HDTV community, and it appears as if the final D-Theater title was published in 2005 with the 20th Century Fox release of I, Robot.

In 2006, the first pre-recorded digital optical HDTV media were introduced. There were two competing standards, Blu-ray and HD DVD. The first HD DVD players and discs were released in the United States on April 18, 2006, while Blu-ray was released on June 20, 2006.

== HD DVD and Blu-ray ==
Since the DVD Forum and the Blu-ray Disc Association failed to agree on standards for high-definition 12-cm discs, a format war was under way between the DVD Forum's HD DVD (formerly "Advanced Optical Disc") standard and the Blu-ray Disc Association's Blu-ray Disc standard.

Although there was disagreement about physical format technology, both the HD DVD and Blu-ray factions selected the same three video codecs to be mandatory in their designs: specifically, MPEG-2 Part 2, VC-1, and H.264/AVC.

They were engaged in a format war up until February 2008, to determine which of the two formats will become the leading carrier for high-definition content to consumers. This situation was similar to the VHS/Betamax format war in consumer video recorders in the late 1980s. The manufacturers of HD DVD, Toshiba, announced in February 2008 that they were ceasing production of their HD DVD players indefinitely, citing low demand for HD DVD and the growing use of Blu-ray, which had become popular due to its inclusion as part of the PlayStation 3 among other things.

There are now some DVD players that will output enhanced or high-definition signals from standard-definition DVDs. This upconversion process can improve the perceived picture quality of standard-definition video.

== Compression codecs ==
Many codecs are in contention such as Microsoft's Windows Media Video version 9 (VC-1), H.264/AVC (MPEG-4 Part 10) and the VP6/VP7 codecs from On2 Technologies.

=== Microsoft VC-1 ===
In an attempt to provide a bitrate-compatible high-definition format for high-definition video on standard DVD-ROMs, Microsoft introduced their Windows Media 9 Series codec with the ability to compress a high-definition bitstream into the same space as a conventional NTSC bitstream (approximately 5 to 9 megabits per second for 720p and higher). Microsoft is marketing its high-definition Windows Media 9 Series codec as WMV HD. It remains to be seen if the codec will be adopted for widespread use, if only as a Wi-Fi industry standard. As of November 2003, this format required a significant amount of processing power to encode and decode, and the only commercially available movie that used the codec was the Terminator 2: Extreme Edition DVD (see 1). Since then, more titles have become available in this format, such as the acclaimed surf documentary Step Into Liquid. As of the start of 2005, Microsoft recommends a 3.0 GHz processor with 512 MB of RAM and a 128 MB video card for 1080p playback on Windows XP, though there are now commercially available DVD players, like the KiSS DP-600, that will play back WMV HD DVD ROMs in high definition on HDTV sets. The codec has been submitted to, and approved by, SMPTE and is now officially SMPTE Standard 421M, also known as VC-1.

=== MPEG4/H.264 ===
H.264 as a standard has already been selected and adopted by the biggest broadcasters in the U.S. (DirecTV, DISH Network) and Europe (BSkyB, Premiere, Canal+, TPS, ...). H.264 was chosen for several reasons: The standard was validated as an open standard at least a year before VC-1 was seriously considered as a potential open standard, and, then, there is a lot of uncertainty on the levies Microsoft may want to impose once the algorithm is adopted.

=== VP6 ===
VP6 was reported by On2 to have been chosen by China for use in the Enhanced Versatile Disc (EVD) format initiative. As reported, this was a result of China's desire to avoid royalties on WM9 or AVC. As an advantage, VP6 would not require royalties on recorded media (although royalties would be charged for player devices at a similar cost as for other codecs).

As China starts to dominate manufacturing of TV and DVD units, the country's choice of standards becomes more important for everyone. A low cost for the codec itself is not a significant advantage over DVD, however, as the standalone hardware players will be incompatible with standard DVD-Video unless the manufacturer pays the royalties for the technologies necessary to make the player DVD-compatible.

Very few titles were made available in any market for this format, although it is presumed that many would be needed to drive purchase of incompatible players. Because of this, it is unlikely any major U.S. studio will commit to movies in this format without some form of copy-protection, which is not yet specified.

Soon after the announcement that VP6 would be used on EVD, negotiations between On2 and E-World (the consortium pushing EVD to become a standard) broke down. On2 filed multiple breach of contract claims for arbitration, but in March 2005 the arbitrator ruled that E-World had not broken the contract and owed nothing to On2. It was unclear to On2 and the arbitrator whether the Chinese government ever approved the EVD proposal as a standard.

=== HDV ===
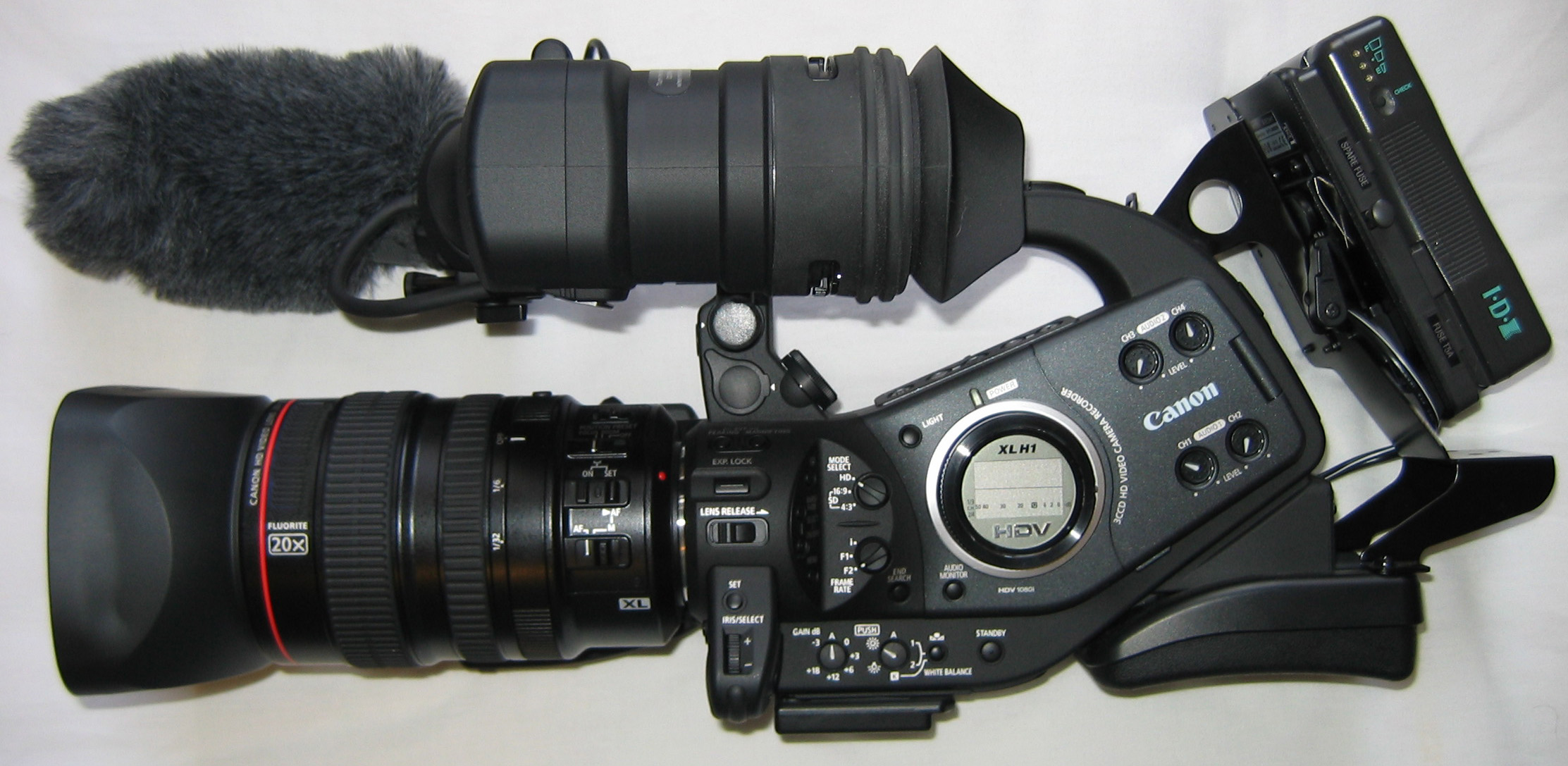
Canon XL H1 records 16:9 HD with a 1440x1080 sensor, its pixels having a 1:1.333 aspect ratio.

The standard for consumer/prosumer HDTV acquisition is HDV (High Definition Video). It records MPEG-2 TS compressed HDTV video on standard DV media (regular DV or MiniDV cassette tape) and transfers it using FireWire. At this time all consumer/prosumer HD camcorders only record at a maximum resolution of 1440x1080. The image is then stretched from a 4:3 aspect ratio to a 16:9 aspect ratio. This means that even consumer or prosumer camcorders that claim 1080i resolution do not include the full horizontal resolution of 1,920 pixels per line. All major prosumer and consumer camcorder vendors provide cameras in this segment.

Broadcast-level HD camcorders and other cameras sometimes record to hard drives via a raw input/output or to tape or flash cards in formats that support higher bitrates than standard DV cassettes such a DVCPro HD. Recording at 100 Mbit/s, it uses a better color compression method to give better color representation than a standard MiniDV or other DV25 cassette and less compression artifacts.

Sony HDCAM tape format records 4:2:2 YPbPr 1920 x 1080P at up to 30 frame/s at 140 Mbit/s (using compression).

Sony HDCAM SR tape format records 10-bit 4:4:4 RGB 1920 x 1080P at up to 30 frame/s at 880 Mbit/s (4.2:1 compression).

== Broadcasters ==
So far, only a handful of very minor broadcasters are seriously considering VC-1. It has been thought for a while that VC-1 was better adapted for the IPTV world than H.264, but press announcements have also already been made by some of the largest STB manufacturers like Amino, Pace, Kreatel demonstrating solutions based on H.264 standards.

The main areas of dominance of VC-1 seem to currently be in the Blu-ray Disc and, for obvious reason, the home PCs.

In fact, there is some concern in the community that Microsoft may have appropriated itself the H.264 standard, modified and improved upon it and are trying to resell the solution as VC-1, without providing dues to the MPEG LA. However, this is currently a rumor and has not yet been challenged.

=== Online HD ===
H.264 has made significant progress towards becoming a widespread video format on the internet thanks to Apple Computer's QuickTime software supporting the format as of version 7. Since many movie trailers are released in QuickTime format, when movie distributors started releasing HD trailers on the web the format they chose was H.264. H.264 is also used by some for encoding video podcasts. Some recorded shows, series and movies are shared via P2P-services.
