= Intel Quick Sync Video =

Video encoding and decoding hardware by Intel

Intel Quick Sync Video is Intel's brand for its dedicated video encoding and decoding hardware core. Quick Sync was introduced with the Sandy Bridge CPU microarchitecture on 9 January 2011 and has been found on the die of Intel CPUs ever since.

The name "Quick Sync" refers to the use case of quickly transcoding ("converting") a video from, for example, a DVD or Blu-ray Disc to a format appropriate to, for example, a smartphone, in situations where speed is more important than the best possible quality.

Unlike video encoding on a CPU or a general-purpose GPU, Quick Sync is a dedicated hardware core on the processor die. This allows for much more power-efficient video processing.

== Availability ==
Quick Sync Video is available on Core i3, Core i5, Core i7, and Core i9 and new Core Ultra processors starting with Sandy Bridge, and Celeron & Pentium processors starting with Haswell.

== Performance and quality ==
Like most desktop hardware-accelerated encoders, Quick Sync has been praised for its speed. The eighth annual MPEG-4 AVC/H.264 video codecs comparison showed that Quick Sync was comparable to x264 superfast preset in terms of speed, compression ratio and quality (SSIM); tests were performed on an Intel Core i7-3770 (Ivy Bridge) processor. However, Quick Sync could not be configured to spend more time to achieve higher quality, whereas x264 improved significantly when allowed to use more time using the recommended settings.

A 2012 evaluation by AnandTech showed that QuickSync on Intel's Ivy Bridge produced similar image quality compared to the NVENC encoder on Nvidia's GTX 680 while performing much better at resolutions lower than 1080p.

== Development ==
Quick Sync was first unveiled at Intel Developer Forum 2010 (September 13) but, according to Tom's Hardware, Quick Sync had been conceptualized five years before that. The older Clarkdale microarchitecture had hardware video decoding support, but no hardware encoding support; it was known as Intel Clear Video.

Version 1 (Sandy Bridge)
Quick Sync was initially built into some Sandy Bridge CPUs, but not into Sandy Bridge Pentiums or Celerons. It adds H.264/AVC encoding and VC-1 decoding acceleration.

Version 2 (Ivy Bridge, Bay Trail)
The Ivy Bridge microarchitecture included a "next-generation" implementation of Quick Sync.

Version 3 (Haswell)
The Haswell microarchitecture implementation adds H.262/MPEG-2 Part 2 encoding acceleration. An open-source hybrid driver was developed which supports partial VP8 encoding and VP9 decoding acceleration under Linux by utilizing both the integrated GPU and CPU, although as of 2023 Intel had explicitly abandoned both this driver and pre-Kaby Lake accelerated VP8 encoding. Starting from Haswell, Pentiums and Celerons have included QSV technology.

Version 4 (Broadwell)
The Broadwell microarchitecture implementation adds VP8 hardware decoding. Also, it has two independent bit stream decoder (BSD) rings to process video commands on GT3 GPUs; this allows one BSD ring to process decoding and the other BSD ring to process encoding at the same time.

Version 5 (Skylake)
The Skylake microarchitecture implementation adds a full fixed-function H.265/HEVC 8-bit 4:2:0 decoding and encoding acceleration, hybrid and partial HEVC 10-bit decoding acceleration, JPEG encoding acceleration for resolutions up to 16,000×16,000 pixels, and partial VP9 decoding and encoding acceleration, although on Linux Intel has explicitly abandoned both the required "hybrid" driver and Skylake accelerated VP9 decoding.

Version 6 (Kaby Lake, Coffee Lake, Whiskey Lake, Comet Lake)
The Kaby Lake, Coffee Lake, Whiskey Lake and Comet Lake microarchitectures implementation adds full fixed-function H.265/HEVC 10-bit 4:2:0 decoding and encoding acceleration, and full fixed-function VP9 8-bit and 10-bit decoding acceleration and 8-bit encoding acceleration.

Version 7 (Ice Lake)
The Ice Lake microarchitecture implementation adds VP9 8-bit and 10-bit decoding and encoding acceleration, H.265/HEVC 8-bit and 10-bit decoding and encoding acceleration with 4:2:2 and 4:4:4 chroma subsampling, HDR10 Tone Mapping and Open Source Media Shaders. HEVC hardware encoding quality has also been improved.

Version 8 (Tiger Lake, Rocket Lake, Alder Lake, Raptor Lake)
The Tiger Lake, Rocket Lake, Alder Lake & Raptor Lake microarchitectures implementation adds VP9 12-bit & 12-bit 4:4:4 hardware decoding and HEVC 12-bit 4:2:0, 4:2:2 and 4:4:4 hardware decoding. Gen12 Xe will also support native AV1 decode, which includes 10-bit 4:2:0 16K stills and 10-bit 4:2:0 8K, 4K and 2K video. Hardware encoding for VP8 was dropped and hardware decoding is only available on Tiger Lake.

Version 9 (Intel Arc Alchemist, Meteor Lake, Arrow Lake)
Intel Arc Alchemist (discrete GPUs) adds 8K 10-bit AV1 hardware encoding. It removed VC-1 hardware decoding.

Version 10 (Intel Lunar Lake)
Adds VVC hardware decoding in Xe2 GPU.

== Operating system support ==
The Quick Sync Video SIP core needs to be supported by the device driver. The device driver provides one or more interfaces, for example VDPAU, Video Acceleration API (VA-API) or DXVA for video decoding, and OpenMAX IL or VA API for video encoding. One of these interfaces is then used by end-user software, for example VLC media player or GStreamer, to access the Quick Sync Video hardware and make use of it.

=== Linux ===
Quick Sync support on Linux is available by both Intel VAAPI Driver (legacy, pre-Broadwell) and Intel Media Driver (Broadwell and newer) which also uses VA-API, and through the Intel Media SDK.

=== Windows ===
Microsoft offers support for Quick Sync in Windows (in Windows Vista and later) based on supporting driver software from Intel and support through both DirectX as well as WMF (Windows Media Foundation). A wide range of applications are based upon this base support for the technology in Windows.

=== macOS ===
Apple added Quick Sync support in OS X Mountain Lion for AirPlay, FaceTime, iTunes, Safari, QuickTime X, iMovie, Final Cut Pro X, Motion and Compressor. Third-party software includes Adobe Premiere Pro, Adobe Media Encoder, DaVinci Resolve and others.

== Hardware decoding and encoding ==
Support for Quick Sync hardware accelerated decoding of H.264, MPEG-2, and VC-1 video is widely available. One common way to gain access to the technology on Microsoft Windows is by use of the free ffdshow filter. Some other free software like VLC media player (since version 2.1.0 "Rincewind") supports Quick Sync as well. Many commercial applications also benefit from the technology today, including CyberLink PowerDVD, CyberLink PowerDirector and MacroMotion Bogart "gold" edition.

According to the ffdshow documentation, Quick Sync has very low CPU utilization while being about twice as fast as libavcodec.

Support for hardware-assisted media encoding tailored for Quick Sync is widely available. Examples of such software with Quick Sync support during encoding processes are Jellyfin, Emby Media Server, Plex Media Server, Badaboom Media Converter, CyberLink MediaShow, CyberLink MediaEspresso, ArcSoft MediaConverter, MAGIX Video Pro X, Pinnacle Studio (since version 18), Roxio Toast, Roxio Creator, XSplit Broadcaster, XSplit Gamecaster (all commercial) and projects like HandBrake, Open Broadcaster Software or applications for operation with a video content entering in Adobe CC2018.

The following table shows fixed-function encode/decode support for various Intel platforms. Support for hybrid and/or partial decode/encode are not detailed.

Fixed-function Quick Sync Video format support
Platform	Gen	MPEG-2	AVC		VC-1	JPEG	VP8	HEVC (4:2:0/4:2:2/4:4:4)			VP9 (4:2:0/4:4:4)			AV1 (4:2:0/4:4:4)	VVC
Platform	Gen	MPEG-2	8-bit	10-bit	VC-1	JPEG	VP8	8-bit	10-bit	12-bit	8-bit	10-bit	12-bit	8/10-bit	VVC
Cantiga	4	Decode	No	No	No	No	No	No	No	No	No	No	No	No	No
Clarkdale / Arrandale	5	Decode	Decode	No	No	No	No	No	No	No	No	No	No	No	No
Sandy Bridge	6	Decode	Yes	No	Decode	No	No	No	No	No	No	No	No	No	No
Ivy Bridge	7	Yes	Yes	No	Decode	Decode	No	No	No	No	No	No	No	No	No
Haswell	7.5	Yes	Yes	No	Decode	Decode	Encode on Linux only (Note: Partially-acceleration (hybrid) probvided by intel-hybrid-driver.)	No	No	No	No	No	No	No	No
Haswell Refresh	7.5	Yes	Yes	No	Decode	Decode	Encode on Linux only	No	No	No	Decode on Linux only (4:2:0)	No	No	No	No
Broadwell	8	Yes	Yes	No	Decode	Decode	Encode on Linux only, decode	No	No	No	Decode on Linux only (4:2:0)	No	No	No	No
Braswell / Cherry Trail	8	Yes	Yes	No	Decode	Yes	Yes	Decode (4:2:0)	No	No	Decode on Linux only (4:2:0)	No	No	No	No
Skylake	9	Yes	Yes	No	Decode	Yes	Yes	Yes (4:2:0)	No	No	Decode on Linux only (4:2:0)	No	No	No	No
Apollo Lake	9	Yes	Yes	No	Decode	Yes	Yes	Yes (4:2:0)	Decode (4:2:0)	No	Decode (4:2:0)	No	No	No	No
Kaby Lake / Coffee Lake / Comet Lake / Whiskey Lake	9.5	Yes	Yes	No	Decode	Yes	Yes	Yes (4:2:0)	Yes (4:2:0)	No	Decode (4:2:0)	Decode (4:2:0)	No	No	No
Gemini Lake	9.5	Yes	Yes	No	Decode	Yes	Yes	Yes (4:2:0)	Decode (4:2:0)	No	Decode (4:2:0)	Decode (4:2:0)	No	No	No
Ice Lake	11	Yes	Yes	No	Decode	Yes	Yes	Yes	Yes	No	Yes	Yes	No	No	No
Jasper Lake	11	Decode	Yes	No	Decode	Yes	Decode	Yes (Note: Does not support 4:2:2 encoding.)	Yes	No	Yes	Yes	No	No	No
Tiger Lake	12 (Xe)	Yes	Yes	No	Decode	Yes	Decode	Yes	Yes	Yes (Encode 4:2:0 only)	Yes	Yes	Decode	Decode (4:2:0)	No
Rocket Lake	12 (Xe)	Yes	Yes	No	Decode	Yes	No	Yes	Yes	Yes (Encode 4:2:0 only)	Yes	Yes	Decode	Decode (4:2:0)	No
Alder Lake / Raptor Lake	12.2	Yes	Yes	No	Decode	Yes	No	Yes	Yes	Yes (Encode 4:2:0 only)	Yes	Yes	Decode	Decode (4:2:0)	No
Arc Alchemist	12.7	Decode	Yes	No	Decode	Yes	No	Yes	Yes	Decode	Yes	Yes	Decode	Yes (4:2:0)	No
Meteor Lake / Arrow Lake	12.7	Decode	Yes	No	No	Yes	Decode	Yes	Yes	Decode	Yes	Yes	Decode	Yes (4:2:0)	No
Arc Battlemage	Xe 2	Decode	Yes	No	No	Yes	Decode	Yes	Yes	Decode	Yes	Yes	Decode	Yes (4:2:0)	No
Lunar Lake	Xe 2	Decode	Yes	No	No	Yes	Decode	Yes	Yes	Decode	Yes	Yes	Decode	Yes (4:2:0)	Decode
Panther Lake	Xe 3	Decode	Yes	Decode	No	Yes	Decode	Yes	Yes	Decode	Yes	Yes	Decode	Yes	Decode
Platform	Gen	MPEG-2	AVC		VC-1	JPEG	VP8	HEVC (4:2:0/4:2:2/4:4:4)			VP9 (4:2:0/4:4:4)			AV1 (4:2:0/4:4:4)	VVC
Platform	Gen	MPEG-2	8-bit	10-bit	VC-1	JPEG	VP8	8-bit	10-bit	12-bit	8-bit	10-bit	12-bit	8/10-bit	VVC

Certain low-end and high-end parts (including multi-socket Xeons and some Extreme Edition CPUs expected to be used with a dedicated GPU) do not contain the hardware core to support Quick Sync.

== See also ==
=== Video Hardware Technologies ===
==== AMD ====
- Video Core Next – AMD's current equivalent SIP core (since 2018)
- Unified Video Decoder – AMD's decoding SIP core (until 2017)
- Video Coding Engine – AMD's encoding SIP core (until 2017)

==== Intel ====
- Quick Sync Video
- Clear Video – video decoding using a general purpose Intel GPU

==== Nvidia ====
- Nvidia NVENC – Nvidia's current generation equivalent encoding SIP core
- Nvidia NVDEC and PureVideo – Nvidia's equivalent decoding SIP core

==== Others ====
- Amlogic Video Engine
- Qualcomm Hexagon
- Broadcom Crystal HD
