= On2 Flix =

On2 Flix was a family of Flash video encoding applications for Microsoft Windows and Mac OS. On2 Technologies acquired Flix from Wildform, Inc. in May, 2005, shortly after Macromedia announced that it would use On2's VP6 video codec in the Flash 8 platform.

== Products ==
The flagship product in the family was Flix Pro. The company also offered On2 Flix Standard, which was a stripped-down version of Pro.

The On2 Flix Exporter was a QuickTime plugin that enabled users to export Flash video directly from QuickTime enabled video editing applications.

== Development kit ==
On2 also offered a Software Development Kit version of Flix called On2 Flix Engine. The Engine could be used to encode Flash video in server applications or to integrate the On2 Flix encoding engine into client applications.

== Clients ==
On December 1, 2005, On2 announced that Skype (later bought by eBay, and then Microsoft) had licensed current and future versions of its video compression software and had integrated it into the beta version of Skype 2.0. No financial terms were disclosed relating to the deal.

BBC reporters use On2 for satellite phone reporting.
