= HandBrake =

Free and open-source digital video transcoding software

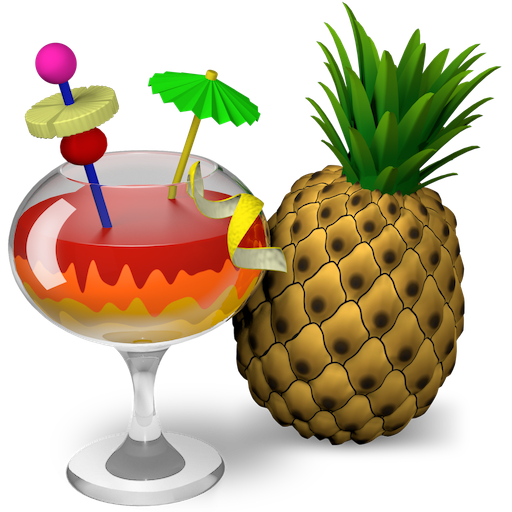

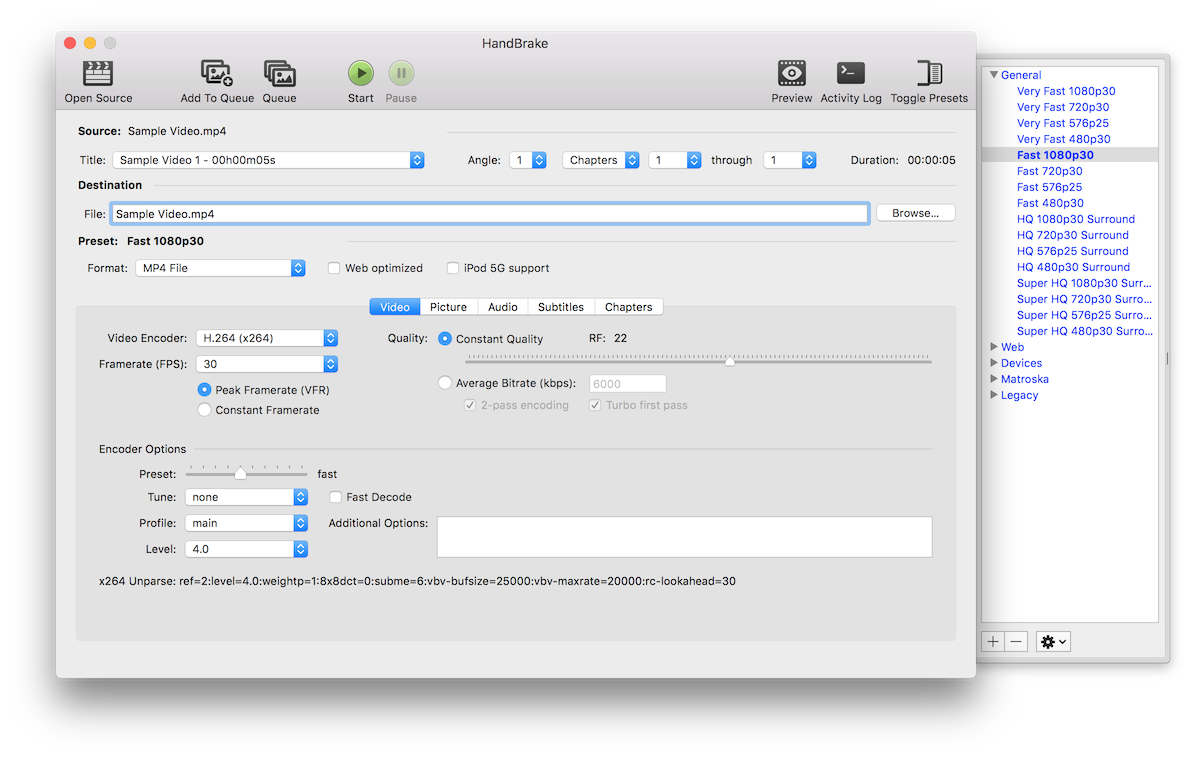
- HandBrake 1.0.0 running on macOS Sierra
- Original author: Eric "titer" Petit
- Developer: HandBrake Team
- Initial release: 24 August 2003 (22 years ago)
- Stable release: 1.11.1 / 22 March 2026
- Written in: Objective-C, C, C#
- Operating system: Linux, macOS, Windows
- Platform: x64
- Size: Linux: 22.3 MB; Windows: 23.78 MB; macOS: 19.4 MB
- Available in: English*, German*, French, Italian, Russian, others — *documentation available in the marked languages
- Type: Transcoding
- License: GPL-2.0-only (Third-party components have their own licenses)
- Website: handbrake.fr
- Repository: github.com/HandBrake/HandBrake

HandBrake is a free and open-source transcoder for digital video files. It was originally developed in 2003 by Eric Petit to make ripping DVDs to a data storage device easier. HandBrake's backend contains comparatively little original code; the program is an integration of many third-party audio and video libraries, both codecs (such as FFmpeg, x264, and x265) and other components such as video deinterlacers (referred to as "filters"). These are collected in such a manner to make their use more effective and accessible (e.g., so that a user does not have to transcode a video's audio and visual components in separate steps, or with inaccessible command-line utilities).

HandBrake clients are available for Linux, macOS, and Windows.

== History ==
=== Early versions ===
HandBrake was originally developed by Eric Petit in 2003 as software for BeOS, before being ported to other systems. He continued to be the primary developer until April 2006, when the last official Subversion revision was committed. Petit continued to be active on the HandBrake forum for a brief period after. From May–June 2006, no one in the HandBrake community was successful in contacting Petit, and no further code changes were officially made.

=== MediaFork ===
In September 2006, Rodney Hester and Chris Long had been independently working to extract the H.264 video compression format from Apple's iPod firmware (1.2) through reverse engineering before meeting on the HandBrake forum. Since their work was complementary, they began working together to develop an unstable, but still compilable, release of HandBrake supporting the H.264 format. Hester and Long made progress in terms of stability, functionality, and look and feel, but it was not possible to submit their patch to the HandBrake subversion repository without authorization from Petit.

Unable to submit their revisions as a successor to HandBrake, Hester created a subversion repository mirroring HandBrake's final subversion (0.7.1) on the HandBrake website and began development on top of that. Hester and Long named the new project MediaFork.

=== From 2007 ===
On 13 February 2007, Hester and Long were contacted by Petit, who informed them of his support and encouraged them to continue developing. Plans were then made to reintegrate MediaFork as a direct successor to HandBrake. The MediaFork website and forums were moved to HandBrake's, and the next release was officially named HandBrake. On 24 December 2016, after more than 13 years of development, HandBrake 1.0.0 was released.

There is another transcoder, called VidCoder, that uses HandBrake as its encoding engine.

== Features ==
=== Transcoding ===
Users can customize the output by altering the bit rate, maximum file size or bit rate and sample rate via "constant quality". HandBrake supports adaptive deinterlacing, scaling, detelecine, and cropping, both automatic and manual.

=== Batch ===
HandBrake supports batch encoding through graphical user interface (GUI) and command-line interface (CLI). Third-party scripts and UIs exist specifically for this purpose, such as HandBrake Batch Encoder, VideoScripts, and Batch HandBrake. All make use of the CLI to enable queueing of several files in a single directory.

=== Sources ===
HandBrake transcodes video and audio from nearly any format to a handful of modern ones, but it does not defeat or circumvent copy protection. One form of input is DVD-Video stored on a DVD, in an ISO image of a DVD, or on any data storage device as a VIDEO_TS folder.

As with DVDs, HandBrake does not directly support the decryption of Blu-ray discs. However, HandBrake can be used to transcode a Blu-ray disc if DRM is first removed using a third-party application.

== Support ==
=== Input ===
- DVD-Video (from disc or ISO image)
- Matroska (MKV)
- Audio Video Interleave (AVI)
- MPEG-4 Part 14 (MP4)
- MPEG Transport Stream (TS)
- BDAV MPEG-2 Transport Stream (M2TS)

=== Output ===
Container formats

- MPEG-4 Part 14 (MP4)
- iTunes Video (M4V)
- Matroska (MKV)
- AVI (up to version 0.9.3)
- WebM

Video formats

- H.264 using x264, Nvidia NVENC, Intel QSV and AMD VCE
- H.265/HEVC using x265, Nvidia NVENC, Intel QSV and AMD VCE
- MPEG-4 ASP using libav
- MPEG-2 using libav
- Theora using libtheora
- VP8 and VP9 using libvpx
- AV1 using SVT-AV1 and Intel Quick Sync Video
- FFV1

Audio formats

- Advanced Audio Coding (AAC) using libav for Windows and Linux or using CoreAudio in macOS
- HE-AAC (till version 0.10.3 for Windows and Linux), using CoreAudio on macOS
- AC-3
- FLAC 16-bit and 24-bit
- MPEG-1 or MPEG-2 Audio Layer III (MP3)
- Opus
- Vorbis
- TrueHD
- Apple Lossless Audio Codec (ALAC) 16-bit and 24-bit
- Pass-through for AAC, AC-3, DTS, DTS-HD, E-AC-3, FLAC, MP3, ALAC, and TrueHD

== Reception ==
In 2011, Preston Gralla of PC World praised HandBrake for its feature set: "Advanced users will be pleased at the number of options." However, he criticized the usability for new users: "Note that HandBrake isn't necessarily the easiest program to use. It has a large number of options available, and there's no good explanation of what they do or how to use them. Beginners should stick with the defaults". He concluded by calling HandBrake a "solid choice" for people who are looking for a free video transcoder.

In 2013, Lifehacker.com visitors voted HandBrake as the most popular video converter over four other candidates by a wide margin.

== See also ==
- Comparison of video converters
- List of OpenCL applications
