= VBV =

VBV is a three letter acronym that can refer to:

- Verified by Visa, an online security system for credit card transactions
- The Video buffering verifier, a theoretical MPEG video decoder used to assess bitstream compliance
- The Vanuabalavu Airport in Vanua Balavu, Fiji, which uses IATA airport code VBV.
- IOC sport code for beach volleyball at the Summer Olympics
