= MulticoreWare =

American software development company

MulticoreWare Inc.
- Type: Private
- Industry: Software Products & Services
- Founded: 2009
- Headquarters: San Jose, California, US
- Number of locations: 6 (2015)
- Key people: A.G. Karunakaran (CEO); John Stratton (CTO)
- Products: x265, UHDcode, MxPA
- Services: Neural Networks, Heterogeneous Computing, video streaming, Human Behavior AI, Pose estimation, Sensor fusion, ADAS, Radar, Lidar, CUDA, OpenCL, OpenMP, Deep Learning, driver monitoring system, HEVC, LLVM, FPGA, CPU, GPU, HALIDE, VVC, compiler, Automotive Functional Safety, Autonomous Mobility
- Number of employees: 500+
- Website: multicorewareinc.com

MulticoreWare Inc is a software development company, offering products and services related to HEVC video compression, machine learning (specifically, convolutional neural networks), compilers for heterogeneous computing and software performance optimization services.

MulticoreWare's customers include AMD, Microsoft, Google, Qualcomm and Telestream.

The company was founded in 2009 and has offices in the United States, China and India.

== Recent developments ==
MulticoreWare Achieves ISO 9001 and ISO 27001 Certifications

MulticoreWare Acquires Simulus Automation to Expand Semiconductor Engineering Capabilities

In 2026, MulticoreWare and Small Pixels announced an AI-powered video optimization solution designed to reduce bandwidth and infrastructure costs for video delivery workflows.

MulticoreWare collaborated with AMD on a retail checkout solution using AMD Ryzen Embedded processors.

In 2026, MulticoreWare announced plans to join Qualcomm's Authorized Design Center Program for AI and edge computing solutions.
