= SheerVideo =

Family of proprietary lossless video codecs developed by BitJazz Inc

SheerVideo was a family of proprietary lossless video codecs developed by BitJazz Inc. The codecs enabled devices to play, capture, edit, and archive high-quality lossless videos in real time.

As of July 2023, SheerVideo is still available as a set of QuickTime codecs on Mac and Windows and as a set of AVI codecs on Windows.

SheerVideo can stream uncompressed-quality video at 1920x1080 resolution at 30 frames per second over a FireWire 800 line.

SheerVideo was available for Mac OS X, Mac OS 8, and Mac OS 9.

SheerVideo supports SD, HD, NTSC, and PAL, progressive and interlaced.

== History ==
SheerVideo was initially developed by Andreas Wittenstein at BitJazz Inc. in July 2002.

BitJazz released a version of SheerVideo that supported Intel-based Macs natively.

As of September 2022, SheerVideo is no longer under active development.
