= On2 Technologies =

American video technology company

On2 Technologies Inc.
- Type: Subsidiary of Google Inc.
- Industry: Video codec technology
- Founded: 1992, Clifton Park, New York
- Defunct: June 21, 2010
- Fate: Acquired by Google
- Key people: J. Allen Kosowsky, Chairman; Matthew C. Frost, COO; Tim Reusing, GC; James Bankoski, Senior VP; Paul Wilkins, Senior VP; Wayne Boomer, Senior VP; Yaowu Xu, Senior VP
- Products: TrueMotion S, TrueMotion 2, TrueMotion RT 2.0, VP3, VP4, VP5, TrueMotion VP6, TrueMotion VP7 and VP8
- Parent: Google

On2 Technologies, formerly known as The Duck Corporation, was a small publicly traded company (on the American Stock Exchange), founded in New York City in 1992 and headquartered in Clifton Park, New York, that designed video codec technology. It created a series of video codecs called TrueMotion (including TrueMotion S, TrueMotion 2, TrueMotion RT 2.0, TrueMotion VP3, 4, 5, 6, 7 and 8).

In February 2010, On2 Technologies was acquired by Google for an estimated $124.6 million. On2's VP8 technology became the core of Google's WebM video file format.

== History ==
While known by the name The Duck Corporation, they developed TrueMotion S, a codec that was used by some games for full motion video (FMV) sequences during the 1990s. The original office of the Duck Corporation was founded in New York City by Daniel B. Miller, Victor Yurkovsky, and Stan Marder. In 1994 Duck opened its first "satellite" engineering office in Colonie, NY under the management of Eric Ameres. Miller became CEO of newly renamed On2 Technologies until Doug McIntyre was hired in late 2000, when Miller resumed his role as CTO. CEO's after McIntyre included Bill Joll and Matt Frost.

After Miller's departure in 2003, newly promoted CTO Eric Ameres moved the primary engineering office to upstate NY's capital region. Ameres later departed in 2007 to pursue other research as part of the opening of the Experimental Media and Performing Arts Center (EMPAC) at his alma mater, Rensselaer Polytechnic Institute (RPI). After Ameres' departure in 2007 Paul Wilkins served as co-CTO with Jim Bankoski. Wilkins was founder of "Metavisual" which was acquired by On2 in 1999 to bring the VP3 codec to market. The VP3 codec became the basis of On2's future codecs as well as the basis of the open source Theora video codec.

In 1995, The Duck Corporation raised $1.7 million in venture funding from Edelson Technology Partners.

In 1997, they raised an additional $7 million in a venture round primarily financed by Citigroup Ventures.

In 1999, The Duck Corporation merged with Applied Capital Funding, Inc., a public company on the American Stock Exchange. The merged entity was first renamed On2.Com and then On2 Technologies, trading on the AMEX as ONT. ONT's price peaked at a little over $40 per share, briefly giving the company a market cap in excess of $1 billion.

On April 4, 2000, On2 bought Quickband, Inc. ("Quickband"), a wholly owned subsidiary of the company, acquired substantially all of the assets of DVD Mags, Inc. ("DVD Mags"), a California corporation in the business of aggregating and producing short-form entertainment content for distribution across digital and traditional channels (the "Quickband Acquisition"). The Quickband Acquisition was effected pursuant to an Asset Purchase Agreement ("Purchase Agreement") dated as of March 9, 2000 by and among the company, Quickband and DVD Mags.

On November 3, 2000, On2 acquired the game engine development company Eight Cylinders Studios.

In May 2007, On2 announced an agreement to acquire Finnish Hantro Products, a provider of video codecs for chips for wireless devices. The acquisition was finalized on November 1, 2007.

In November 2008, On2 announced that it would partner with Zencoder to create Flix Cloud, a high-capacity online video encoding service using Amazon Elastic Compute Cloud (EC2). Flix Cloud launched in April 2009.

=== Acquisition by Google ===
On 5 August 2009, Google offered to acquire On2 Technologies for $106.5 million in Google stock. On 7 January 2010, Google increased its offer to $133.9 million, and on February 17, 2010, the stockholders of On2 Technologies voted to accept the offer. On 19 February 2010, the transaction was completed, valued at approximately $124.6 million.

After this purchase, the following message was posted on the on2.com website: "The On2 products Flix Pro, Flix Standard, Flix Exporter, Flix PowerPlayers, Flix Live, Flix DirectShow SDK, Flix Publisher and Flix Engine are no longer for sale."

In December 2018, it was reported that Google had transferred ownership of On2 Technologies's former domain name under The Duck Corporation, duck.com, to DuckDuckGo, a privacy-focused search engine, and a known competitor of Google. It is not known what price, if any, DuckDuckGo paid for the domain name. DuckDuckGo CEO Gabriel Weinberg said, "We're pleased Google has chosen to transfer ownership of Duck.com to DuckDuckGo. Having Duck.com will make it easier for people to use DuckDuckGo."

== Technology ==
=== TrueMotion S ===
According to the company itself, development started in the early 1990s. The first versions of the codec were mainly targeted at and used for full motion video scenes in computer games. One of the codec's competitive advantages in this field was that, unlike MPEG, it does not require a separate decoder, thus reducing costs to game publishers. At the time, MPEG's dominance was nearly secured, especially with hardware-implementations of the codec, meant to run on special hardware boards only.

This was the first version in the TrueMotion series of proprietary lossy video compression formats and video codec. This format compressed frame in either a 32-bit or 16-bit RGB color space with a FourCC of DUCK (or TMOT for a version of TrueMotion S that was licensed by Horizon Technologies). It is usually put in an AVI container. The filename extension varies from game to game. Some leave it with .avi, other games use .bin or .duc. Gaming consoles which were licensed to use the codec include the Sega Saturn, Sega 32X, and 3DO Interactive Multiplayer. Simon & Schuster first person games such as Star Trek: Borg also used the compression format. Some of the files can be played back with a video player that uses the libavcodec library, such as MPlayer.

In 1995, Horizons Technology Inc. began shipping the TrueMotion-S Compressor software for Macintosh and MS Windows. TrueMotion-S was originally developed by the Duck Corp. for applications such as the Sega game box.

In 1996, the main competitors for TrueMotion S software codec were Cinepak and Indeo in games for first-generation CD-ROM based game consoles.

=== TrueMotion RT ===
The "real time" version in the series was released in 1996. It was meant for real time capturing and processing of digital video.

=== TrueMotion 2 ===
The second version in this series only supported a 24-bit RGB color space optimized for Windows rendering which orders components as BGR with a FourCC of TM20. Used for Final Fantasy VII and Star Trek: Klingon.

In 1997, Microsoft Corp. licensed The Duck Corp.'s TrueMotion 2.0 video codec technology to bring TV-quality video to the PC platform.

=== DK ADPCM Audio 3/4 ===
There are two obsolete versions for associated ADPCM audio compression.

=== TrueMotion VP3/4 ===
On June 1, 2000, brought version 3.1; August 16, 2000 version 3.2. The third version in the series switched to using a planar Y'CbCr 4:2:0 color space.

In late 2001, On2 released their VP3(.2) compression technology into the open-source community including their patents on the technology. The technology lives on in the form of Theora. The Xiph.Org Foundation created its codec Theora as a fork of the codebase of VP3.2. The forked version added 4:2:2 and 4:4:4 sub sampling for better color quality options.

In April 2001 VP4 was published, which brought an improved encoder for the same bitstream format.

=== TrueMotion VP5/6 ===
A preview version of VP5 was published on February 21, 2002, with production version being available as of May 1, 2002. The production version of VP5 codec was released in May 2002.

When the codec was in beta, to preview its quality, On2 created a plug-in for RealPlayer. Lately the final version of the codec was ready. The VP5 codec was limited, when the VP6 came out.

The sixth version like VP3 and VP4 kept the same bitstream as VP5 and added an optional alpha channel to the color space.

In April 2003 AOL has bought broad licensing rights for VP5 and VP6 codecs. More recently, On2 licensed its technology to AOL for use in an IP-based video telephony product, to Tencent Holdings of China for use in its instant messaging products, and to Saver Corporation of Japan to enable new Flash 8 mobile video applications.

On May 12, 2003, On2 announced the release of VP6. Revised versions 6.1 and 6.2 followed later that year. Since October 2003 it may be used free of charge for personal use.

In late 2003, On2 announced that its VP5 and VP6 codecs were selected by Beijing E-World as a video coding method to be used in a Chinese-developed competitor to the DVD format called the EVD (Enhanced Versatile Disc) format. Then in April 2004, On2 announced that its business relationship with E-World had soured, and that On2 would file multiple breach of contract claims against E-World in arbitration proceedings. The arbitrator reached a conclusion on March 10, 2005, according to SEC filings by On2 on March 14, 2005. The arbitrator dismissed each of On2's claims and ruled that E-World owed nothing to On2 and had not breached the contract. It seems unlikely that On2 will ultimately get any significant payback from the EVD initiative, although some contract relationship remains in effect.

A number of less highly visible deals with other customers and partners seem to have worked out more amicably than the Chinese DVD project. Recent announcements have related to deals with Apex Datacom, IWAPI Inc., Vividas, Digital Witness, XM Satellite Radio, PowerLinx, and LeapFrog Enterprises. In particular, the company indicated that it expected to recognize some revenue from the Leapfrog deal in the third quarter of 2005 and also made optimistic statements about the future with XM Satellite Radio.

In 2004, On2's VP6 was selected for use as the Macromedia Flash Video 8 codec. This apparently stems from a deal made in the second quarter of 2004 with revenue in that quarter of $1.4 million for the licensing agreement. In related news, On2 announced on April 5, 2005, that it had acquired the Flix Flash video encoder technology from Wildform, Inc. On2 added support for Flash 8 video output to the Flix 8 product line that they released on September 13, 2005.

=== TrueMotion VP7 ===
The seventh version changed the bitstream from previous versions for better coding efficiency and was released in March 2005; since July it may be used free of charge for personal use.

It is a codec with both VFW and DirectShow support that On2 Technologies claims has better compression than leading competitive codecs such as MPEG-4 AVC (H.264) and VC-1.

On2 Technologies announced TrueMotion VP7 in January 2005. The public release of VP7 codec software was available in March 2005.

On March 9, 2005, On2 announced a new codec, VP7. On2 claimed that VP7 is superior to the H.264/AVC standard, based on claims of comparative technical capabilities and licensing costs. This claim has been disputed by a developer of x264, a popular H.264 encoder.

In April 2005, On2 Technologies licensed On2 Video Codecs (including VP6 and VP7) for Macromedia Flash.

On December 1, 2005, Skype announced that they had licensed current and future versions of its video compression software and had integrated it into the beta version of Skype 2.0 for point-to-point video conferencing Skype protocol. No financial terms were disclosed relating to the deal.

On August 13, 2007, On2 announced the addition of H.264 support to its On2 Flix product line.

Move Networks also used the VP7 codec in its Move Media Player plugin for Firefox and Internet Explorer, used by ABC and Fox for its streaming of full network shows.

=== TrueMotion VP8 ===
VP8 was published in 2008 and marked the transfer of formats to Google with their acquisition of On2 and was open sourced on May 19, 2010. The VP8 codec was licensed under a BSD license.
