= Libvpx =

Codec library implementing VP8 and VP9 encoders and decoders

libvpx
- Screenshot
- Original author: On2 Technologies / Google
- Developer: Alliance for Open Media
- Release: May 19, 2010; 16 years ago
- Stable release: 1.17.0 / 21 August 2026; 2 months ago
- Written in: C, assembly
- Operating system: Unix-like (including Linux, FreeBSD and Mac OS X), Windows
- Type: Video encoder and decoder
- License: New BSD license
- Website: www.webmproject.org/tools/
- Repository: chromium.googlesource.com/webm/libvpx/

libvpx is a free software video codec library from Google and the Alliance for Open Media (AOMedia). It serves as the reference software implementation for the VP8 and VP9 video coding formats, and, for AV1, has a special fork named libaom that was stripped of backwards compatibility.

As free software it is published also in source code under the terms of the revised BSD license. It ships with the commandline tools vpxenc/aomenc and vpxdec/aomdec that build on its functionality.

== History ==
libvpx originates from the video codec company On2 Technologies that sold its first software codec in mid-90s.

libvpx was released as free software by Google on May 19, 2010, after the acquisition of On2 Technologies for an estimate of over 120 million US dollars.

In June 2010, Google amended the VP8 codec software license to the 3-clause BSD license after some contention over whether the original license was actually open source.

Google was criticised for dumping untidy code with bad documentation for the initial release of libvpx and developing behind closed doors without involving the community in the process. The development process was opened after the release of VP9.

Preliminary support for VP9 was added to libvpx on June 17, 2013. It was officially introduced with the release of version 1.3 on December 2, which also supports lossless compression.

In April 2015, Google released a significant update to its libvpx library, with version 1.4.0 adding support for encoding VP9 with 10-bit and 12-bit bit depth, 4:2:2 and 4:4:4 chroma subsampling (VP9 profiles 1, 2, and 3), and VP9 multithreaded decoding/encoding.

Versions 1.5 (November 2015), 1.6 (July 2016), 1.7 (January 2018), and 1.8 (February 2019) delivered significant speedups, both for encoding and decoding.

== Features ==
libvpx implements single-pass and two-pass encoding modes, with either bitrate or quality target settings.

libvpx offers an asymmetric codec – with encoding taking much longer than decoding – and options for configuring encoding expense independently from decoding complexity. A lookahead of up to 25 frames can be configured, which improves compression efficiency but introduces latency and thereby hurts real-time performance.

libvpx includes a mode where the maximum CPU resources possible will be used while still keeping the encoding speed almost exactly equivalent to the playback speed (realtime), keeping the quality as high as possible without lag.

libvpx supports Rec. 601, Rec. 709, Rec. 2020, SMPTE-170, SMPTE-240, and sRGB color spaces.

== Performance ==
At high resolutions (e.g., UHD) VP9 encoded by libvpx for VOD applications provides a significant improvement over H.264 encoded by x264. HEVC encoded by x265 may achieve even better quality, but the royalty-free nature of VP9 makes it a compelling option for delivering high resolution video on supported platforms.

Decoding performance is relatively slow, partially in order to keep the code base easier to maintain. Compared to the initial release of libvpx, ffvp8 from the FFmpeg project improved performance by 22 to over 66%. In 2016, alternative VP9 decoders still achieved 25–50% faster decoding.

== Technology ==
libvpx is written in C and assembly language. It does not have complete SIMD coverage as of 2015.

== Usage ==
libvpx is used by major OTT video services including YouTube, Netflix, Amazon, JW Player, Brightcove, and Telestream, among which are the biggest sources of internet traffic with Netflix alone accounting for nearly a third of all internet traffic in the United States as of 2017.

There are alternatives for decoding VP8 and VP9, both commercial and closed source as well as open source. For encoding there are only commercial alternatives and some unfinished experimental software for VP8 including xvp8 as of 2016.
