= VP3 =

Video codec by On2 Technologies

On2 TrueMotion VP3 is a (royalty-free) lossy video compression format and video codec. It is an incarnation of the TrueMotion video codec, a series of video codecs developed by On2 Technologies.

There is no formal specification for the VP3 bitstream format beyond the VP3 source code published by On2 Technologies. In 2003, Mike Melanson created an incomplete description of the VP3 bitstream format and decoding process at a higher level than source code, with some help from On2 and the Xiph.Org Foundation.

== History ==
VP3 was originally a proprietary and patented video codec. On2 TrueMotion VP3.1 was introduced in May 2000 followed three months later by the VP3.2 release. Later that year, On2 announced VP3 plugins for QuickTime and RealPlayer. In May 2001, On2 released the beta version of its new VP4 proprietary codec. In June 2001, On2 also released a VP3 codec implementation for Microsoft Windows where the encoder was priced at $39.95 for personal use, and $2,995 for limited commercial use. In August 2001, On2 Technologies announced that they would be releasing an open source version of their VP3.2 video compression algorithm. In September 2001 they published the source code and open source license for VP3.2 video compression algorithm at www.vp3.com. The VP3.2 Public License 0.1 granted the right to modify the source code only if the resulting larger work continued to support playback of VP3.2 data.

=== Move to free software ===
In September, 2001 it was donated to the public as open source, and On2 irrevocably disclaimed all rights to it, granting a royalty-free license grant for any patent claims it might have over the software and any derivatives, allowing anyone to use any VP3-derived codec for any purpose. In March 2002, On2 altered licensing terms required to download the source code for VP3 to LGPL.

=== Theora ===
In June 2002 On2 donated VP3 to the Xiph.org Foundation under a BSD-like open source license to make VP3 the basis of a new, free (e.g. patent- and royalty-free) video codec, Theora.

The free video codec Theora was forked off from the released codebase of VP3.2 and further developed into an independent codec. On2 declared Theora to be the successor in VP3's lineage.

Theora developers declared a freeze on the Theora I bitstream format in June 2004, allowing other companies to start implementing encoders and decoders for the format without worrying about the format changing in incompatible ways. The Theora I Specification was published in September 2004. Any later changes in the specification are minor updates. A first stable release (version 1.0) of the Theora reference implementation (libtheora) was released in November 2008.

=== VP4 ===
VP4 was announced in January 2001. On2 Technologies released the beta version of VP4 on May 21, 2001. In June 2001 On2 Technologies posted the production release of VP4 on its website. VP4 brought an improved encoder for VP3 bitstream format. So because of keeping the bitstream format VP4 can't be seen as an individual codec.

On July 19, 2001 On2 announced an agreement with RealNetworks to license its VP4 video compression technology, for set-top boxes and other devices. On2 enabled RealPlayer as the exclusive media player for the VP4 codec and the RealSystem iQ architecture became the only streaming media platform capable of delivering the VP4 codec. The first beta version of a plug-in for RealPlayer was announced in January 2002.

Lately AOL licensed VP4 and created the Nullsoft Streaming Video format. Now the VP4 codec is limited, but still used by AOL.

Later incarnations of this codec are VP5, VP6, VP7, VP8, and VP9.

== See also ==
- TrueMotion S
