= VP6 =

Video codec by On2 Technologies

On2 TrueMotion VP6 is a proprietary lossy video compression format and video codec. It is an incarnation of the TrueMotion video codec, a series of video codecs developed by On2 Technologies. This codec is commonly used by Adobe Flash, Flash Video, JavaFX media files and EA games for video playback.

== Overview ==
The VP6 codec was introduced in May 2003. In October 2003, On2 officially released its TrueMotion VP6 codec.

In November 2003, On2 announced that VP6 had been chosen as a codec for China's Enhanced Versatile Disc (EVD), a competitor format to DVD. Beijing-based company E-World was to be the exclusive reseller of the EVD VP6 technology in China, with On2 Technologies earning royalty payments of about $2 USD per player. Then in April 2004 On2 announced that negotiations with E-World had broken down and that On2 would file multiple breach of contract claims against E-World in arbitration proceedings. In March 2005, On2 announced that the arbitrator had dismissed all of On2's claims and had decided that E-World owed nothing to On2. Although E-World included VP6 to its EVD standardization proposal to the Chinese government, it is not clear what, if any, action was then taken by the government. The EVD format initiative appears to be indefinitely stalled.

In November 2003, On2 announced that the VP6 codec will be used in products for broadcasting in the field, such as with BBC reporters and QuickLink software.

In January 2005, On2 announced a new VP7 codec with better compression capabilities than VP6.

In April 2005, On2 Technologies licensed On2 Video Codec (including VP6 and VP7) for Macromedia Flash. In August 2005, Macromedia announced they had selected VP6 as the flagship new codec for video playback in the new Flash Player 8.

In March 2006, a VP6 decoder (libvp62) appeared as an open-source project, but was driven underground by On2 on copyright infringement claims.

As of September 2006, an open-source implementation of the decoder is part of the libavcodec project. VP6 decoder is part of stable version FFmpeg 0.5, released in March 2009.

In May 2008, Sun Microsystems announced it had licensed On2 TrueMotion codecs to add video capabilities to JavaFX, a family of products for creating Rich Internet Applications (RIAs) across Mobile, Desktop, TV and more. JavaFX uses On2 VP6.

Later incarnations of this codec are VP7, VP8 and VP9.

== See also ==
- VP3
- VP9
