= Codec =

Device or software for encoding or decoding a digital data stream

A codec is a computer hardware or software component that encodes or decodes a data stream or signal. Codec is a portmanteau of coder/decoder.

In electronic communications, an endec is a device that acts as both an encoder and a decoder on a signal or data stream, and hence is a type of codec. Endec is a portmanteau of encoder/decoder.

A coder or encoder encodes a data stream or a signal for transmission or storage, possibly in encrypted form, and the decoder function reverses the encoding for playback or editing. Codecs are used in videoconferencing, streaming media, and video editing applications.

== History ==
Originally, in the mid-20th century, a codec was a hardware device that coded analog signals into digital form using pulse-code modulation (PCM). Later, the term was also applied to software for converting between digital signal formats, including companding functions.

== Examples ==
An audio codec converts analog audio signals into digital signals for transmission or encodes them for storage. A receiving device converts the digital signals back to analog form using an audio decoder for playback. An example of this is the codecs used in the sound cards of personal computers. A video codec accomplishes the same task for video signals.

When implementing the Infrared Data Association (IrDA) protocol, an endec may be used between the UART and the optoelectronic systems.

Examples of hardware codecs include Intel QSV and Azalia Audio; examples of software codecs include FFmpeg (and its Libavcodec).

== Compression ==
In addition to encoding a signal, a codec may also compress the data to reduce transmission bandwidth or storage space. Compression codecs are classified primarily into lossy codecs and lossless codecs.

Lossless codecs are often used for archiving data in compressed form while retaining all information present in the original stream. If preserving the original quality of the stream is more important than eliminating the correspondingly larger data sizes, lossless codecs are preferred. This is especially true if the data is to undergo further processing (for example, editing), in which case the repeated application of processing (encoding and decoding) on lossy codecs will degrade the quality of the resulting data such that it is no longer identifiable (visually, audibly, or both). Using more than one codec or encoding scheme successively can also degrade quality significantly. The decreasing cost of storage capacity and network bandwidth has a tendency to reduce the need for lossy codecs for some media.

Many popular codecs are lossy. They reduce quality in order to maximize compression. Often, this type of compression is virtually indistinguishable from the original uncompressed sound or images, depending on the codec and the settings used. The most widely used lossy data compression technique in digital media is based on the discrete cosine transform (DCT), used in compression standards such as JPEG images, H.26x and MPEG video, and MP3 and AAC audio. Smaller data sets ease the strain on relatively expensive storage sub-systems such as non-volatile memory and hard disk, as well as write-once-read-many formats such as CD-ROM, DVD, and Blu-ray Disc. Lower data rates also reduce cost and improve performance when the data is transmitted, e.g., over the internet.

== Media codecs ==
Two principal techniques are used in codecs: pulse-code modulation and delta modulation. Codecs are often designed to emphasize certain aspects of the media to be encoded. For example, a digital video (using a DV codec) of a sports event needs to encode motion well but not necessarily exact colors, while a video of an art exhibit needs to encode color and surface texture well.

Audio codecs for cell phones need to have very low latency between source encoding and playback. In contrast, audio codecs for recording or broadcasting can use high-latency audio compression techniques to achieve higher fidelity at a lower bit rate.

There are thousands of audio and video codecs, ranging in cost from free to hundreds of dollars or more. This variety of codecs can create compatibility and obsolescence issues. The impact is lessened for older formats, for which free or nearly-free codecs have existed for a long time. The older formats are often ill-suited to modern applications, however, such as playback on small portable devices. For example, raw uncompressed PCM audio (44.1 kHz, 16-bit stereo, as represented on an audio CD or in a .wav or .aiff file) has long been a standard across multiple platforms, but its transmission over networks is slow and expensive compared with more modern compressed formats, such as Opus and MP3.

Many multimedia data streams contain both audio and video, and often some metadata that permits synchronization of audio and video. Each of these three streams may be handled by different programs, processes, or hardware, but for the multimedia data streams to be useful in stored or transmitted form, they must be encapsulated together in a container format.

Lower bitrate codecs allow more users, but they also have more distortion. Beyond the initial increase in distortion, lower bit rate codecs also achieve their lower bit rates by using more complex algorithms that make certain assumptions, such as those about the media and the packet loss rate. Other codecs may not make those same assumptions. When a user with a low bitrate codec talks to a user with another codec, additional distortion is introduced by each transcoding.

Audio Video Interleave (AVI) is sometimes erroneously described as a codec, but AVI is actually a container format, while a codec is a software or hardware tool that encodes or decodes audio or video into or from some audio or video format. Audio and video encoded with many codecs might be put into an AVI container, although AVI is not an ISO standard. There are also other well-known container formats, such as Ogg, ASF, QuickTime, RealMedia, Matroska, and DivX Media Format. MPEG transport stream, MPEG program stream, MP4, and ISO base media file format are examples of container formats that are ISO standardized.

== Malware ==
Fake codecs are used when an online user takes a type of codec and installs viruses and other malware into whatever data is being compressed and uses it as a disguise. This disguise appears as a codec download through a pop-up alert or ad. When a user goes to click or download that codec, the malware is then installed on the computer. Once a fake codec is installed, it is often used to access private data, corrupt an entire computer system or continue spreading the malware. One of the previously most used ways to spread malware was fake AV pages, and with the rise of codec technology, both have been used in combination to take advantage of online users. This combination allows fake codecs to be automatically downloaded to a device through a website linked in a pop-up ad, virus/codec alerts or articles as well.

== See also ==
- Audio signal processing
- Comparison of audio coding formats
- Comparison of video codecs
- Comparison of video container formats
- Digital signal processing
- List of codecs
- List of open-source codecs
- Modem
