= Video buffering verifier =

Theoretical video buffer model

The Video Buffering Verifier (VBV) is a theoretical MPEG video buffer model, used to ensure that an encoded video stream can be correctly buffered, and played back at the decoder device.

By definition, the VBV shall not overflow nor underflow when its input is a compliant stream, (except in the case of low_delay). It is therefore important when encoding such a stream that it comply with the VBV requirements.

One way to think of the VBV is to consider both a maximum bitrate and a maximum buffer size. You'll need to know how quickly the video data is coming into the buffer. Keep in mind that video data is always changing the bitrate so there is no constant number to note how fast the data is arriving. The larger question is how long before the buffer overflows. A larger buffer size simply means that the decoder will tolerate high bitrates for longer periods of time, but no buffer is infinite, so eventually even a large buffer will overflow.

== Operation Modes ==
There are two operational modes of VBV: Constant Bit Rate (CBR) and Variable Bit Rate (VBR). In CBR, the decoder's buffer is filled over time at a constant data rate. In VBR, the buffer is filled at a non-constant rate. In both cases, data is removed from the buffer in varying chunks, depending on the actual size of the coded frames.

== Standards ==
In the H.264 and VC-1 standards, the VBV is replaced with generalized version called Hypothetical Reference Decoder (HRD).
