= Bitstream format =

A bitstream format is the format of the data found in a stream of bits used in a digital communication or data storage application. The term typically refers to the data format of the output of an encoder, or the data format of the input to a decoder when using data compression.

== Processing ==
Standardized interoperability specifications such as the video coding standards produced by the MPEG and the ITU-T, and the audio coding standards produced by the MPEG, often specify only the bitstream format and the decoding process. This allows encoder implementations to use any methods whatsoever that produce bitstreams which conform to the specified bitstream format.

Normally, decoding of a bitstream can be initiated without having to start from the beginning of a file, or the beginning of the data transmission. Some bitstreams are designed for this to occur, for example by using indexes or key frames.

Uses of bit stream decoders (BSD):

- Graphics processing unit (GPU)
- H.264/MPEG-4 AVC
- Unified Video Decoder (UVD) – the video decoding bit-stream technology from ATI Technologies/AMD
- PureVideo – the video decoding bit-stream technology from Nvidia
- Quick Sync Video – the video decoding and encoding bit-stream technology from Intel

== See also ==
- Elementary stream
- Stream processing
