= VP8 =

2008 open and royalty-free video coding format

- Internet media type: video/VP8
- Developed by: On2 Technologies, Google
- Initial release: September 13, 2008
- Type of format: Video coding format
- Contained by: WebM, Matroska
- Extended from: VP7
- Extended to: VP9
- Standard: RFC 6386
- Open format?: Yes (specification under CC-by)
- Free format?: See § History

VP8 is an open and royalty-free video compression format released by On2 Technologies in 2008.

Initially released as a proprietary successor to On2's previous VP7 format, VP8 was released as an open and royalty-free format in May 2010 after Google acquired On2 Technologies. Google provided an irrevocable patent promise on its patents for implementing the VP8 format, and released a specification of the format under the Creative Commons Attribution 3.0 license. That same year, Google also released libvpx, the reference implementation of VP8, under the revised BSD license.

Opera, Firefox, Chrome, Pale Moon, and Chromium support playing VP8 video in HTML video tag. Internet Explorer officially supports VP8 if the user has the DirectShow filter installed. According to Google, VP8 is mainly used in connection with WebRTC and as a format for short looped animations, as a replacement for the Graphics Interchange Format (GIF).

VP8 can be multiplexed into the Matroska-based container format WebM along with Vorbis and Opus audio. The image format WebP is based on VP8's intra-frame coding. VP8's direct successor, VP9, and the royalty-free AV1 codec from the Alliance for Open Media are based on VP8.

== Features ==
VP8 only supports progressive scan video signals with 4:2:0 chroma subsampling and 8 bits per sample. In its first public version, On2's VP8 implementation supports multi-core processors with up to 64 cores simultaneously. At least in the implementation (from August 2011), VP8 is comparatively badly adapted to high resolutions (HD). With only three reference frame buffers needed, VP8 enables decoder implementations with a relatively small memory footprint. The format features a pure intra mode, i.e. using only independently coded frames without temporal prediction, to enable random access in applications like video editing.

== Technology ==
VP8 is a traditional block-based transform coding format. It has much in common with H.264, e.g. some prediction modes. At the time of first presentation of VP8, according to On2 the in-loop filter and the Golden Frames were among the novelties of this iteration. The first definition of such a filter is already found in the H.263 standard, though, and Golden Frames were already in use in VP5 and VP7.

The discrete cosine transform (DCT) on 4×4 blocks and the Walsh–Hadamard transform (WHT) serve as basic frequency transforms. A maximum of three frames can be referenced for temporal prediction: the last Golden Frame (may be an intra frame), alternate reference frame, and the directly preceding frame. The so-called alternate reference frames (altref) can serve as reference-only frames for displaying them can be deactivated. In this case, the encoder can fill them with arbitrary useful image data, even from future frames, and thereby serve the same purpose as the b-frames of the MPEG formats. Similar macroblocks can be assigned to one of up to four (even spatially disjoint) segments and thereby share parameters like the reference frame used, quantizer step size, or filter settings. VP8 offers two different adjustable deblocking filters that are integrated into the codec loops (in-loop filtering). Many coding tools use probabilities that are calculated continuously from recent context, starting at each intra frames. Macro blocks can comprise 4×4, 8×8, or 16×16 samples. Motion vectors have quarter-pixel precision.

== History ==
VP8 was first released by On2 Technologies on September 13, 2008, as On2 TrueMotion VP8, replacing its predecessor, VP7.

After Google acquired On2 in February 2010, calls for Google to release the VP8 source code were made. Most notably, the Free Software Foundation issued an open letter on March 12, 2010, asking Google to gradually replace the usage of Adobe Flash Player and H.264 on YouTube with a mixture of HTML5 and a freed VP8.

Word of an impending open-source release announcement got out on April 12, 2010. On May 19, at its Google I/O conference, Google released the VP8 codec software under a BSD-like license and the VP8 bitstream format specification under an irrevocable free patent license. This made VP8 the second product from On2 Technologies to be opened, following their donation of the VP3 codec in 2002 to the Xiph.Org Foundation, from which they derived the Theora codec.

In February 2011, MPEG LA invited patent holders to identify patents that may be essential to VP8 in order to form a joint VP8 patent pool. As a result, in March the United States Department of Justice (DoJ) started an investigation into MPEG LA for its role in possibly attempting to stifle competition. In July 2011, MPEG LA announced that 12 patent holders had responded to its call to form a VP8 patent pool, without revealing the patents in question, and despite On2 having gone to great lengths to avoid such patents.

In November 2011, the Internet Engineering Task Force published the informational RFC 6386, VP8 Data Format and Decoding Guide.

In March 2013, MPEG LA announced that it had dropped its effort to form a VP8 patent pool after reaching an agreement with Google to license the patents that it alleges "may be essential" for VP8 implementation, and granted Google the right to sub-license these patents to any third-party user of VP8 or VP9. This deal has cleared the way for possible MPEG standardisation as its royalty-free internet video codec, after Google submitted VP8 to the MPEG committee in January 2013.

In March 2013, Nokia asserted a patent claim against HTC and Google for the use of VP8 in Android in a German court; however, on August 5, 2013, the webm project announced that the German court has ruled that VP8 does not infringe Nokia's patent.

Nokia has made an official intellectual property rights (IPR) declaration to the IETF with respect to the VP8 Data Format and Decoding Guide listing 64 granted patents and 22 pending patent applications.

== Implementations ==
=== libvpx ===
The reference implementation of a VP8 (and VP9) codec is found in the programming library libvpx which is released as free software. It has a mode for one-pass and two-pass encoding, respectively, while the one-pass mode is known as being broken and not offering effective control over the target bitrate.

Currently, libvpx is primary software library capable of encoding VP8 video streams, but at least one independent implementation exists in ffvp8enc.

=== Encoding ===
A Video for Windows wrapper of the VP8 codec based on the Google VP8 library (FourCC: VP80) is available.

The WebM Project hardware team in Finland released an RTL hardware encoder for VP8 that is available at no cost for semiconductor manufacturers.

The Nvidia Tegra mobile chipsets have full VP8 hardware encoding and decoding (since Tegra 4).

Nexus 5 could use hardware encoding.

=== Decoding ===
libvpx is capable of decoding VP8 video streams.

On July 23, 2010, Fiona Glaser, Ronald Bultje, and David Conrad of the FFmpeg Team announced the ffvp8 decoder. Through testing, they determined that ffvp8 was faster than Google's own libvpx decoder. The WebM Project hardware team released an RTL hardware decoder for VP8, that is releasable to semiconductor companies at zero cost. TATVIK Technologies announced a VP8 decoder that is optimized for the ARM Cortex-A8 processor. Marvell's ARMADA 1500-mini chipset has VP8 SD and HD hardware decoding support (used in Chromecast). Intel has full VP8 decoding support built into their Bay Trail chipsets. Intel Broadwell also adds VP8 hardware decoding support.

=== Operating system support ===
VP8 support by different operating systems
	Microsoft Windows	macOS	BSD / Linux	Android OS	iOS
Codec support	Yes	Yes	Yes	Yes	Yes
Container support	On Windows 10 Anniversary Update (1607): WebM (.webm is not recognised; requires pseudo extension); Matroska (.mkv); On Windows 10 October 2018 Update (1809): WebM (.webm is recognised officially)	WebM (.webm): Introduced in macOS 11.3	WebM (.webm); Matroska (.mkv)	WebM (.webm); Matroska (.mkv)	WebM (.webm): Introduced in iOS 17.4
Notes	On Windows 10: On Anniversary Update (1607), limited support is available in Microsoft Edge (via MSE only) and Universal Windows Platform apps.; On April 2018 Update (1803) with Web Media Extensions preinstalled, Microsoft Edge (EdgeHTML 17) supports VP8 videos embedded in <video> tags.; On October 2018 Update (1809), VP9 Video Extensions is preinstalled. It enables encoding of VP8 and VP9 content on devices that don't have a hardware-based video encoder.		-	Support introduced in Android 2.3.3+; Streamable in Android 4.0+	

== Related formats ==
=== WebM ===
Also on May 19, 2010, the WebM Project was launched, featuring contributions from "Mozilla, Opera, Google and more than forty other publishers, software and hardware vendors" in a major effort to use VP8 as the video format for HTML5. In the WebM container format, the VP8 video is used with Vorbis or Opus audio. Internet Explorer 9 will support VP8 video playback if the proper codec is installed. Android is WebM-enabled from version 2.3 - Gingerbread. Since Android 4.0, VP8 could be read inside mkv and WebM could be streamed. Adobe also announced that the Flash Player will support VP8 playback in a future release.

=== WebP ===
On September 30, 2010, Google announced WebP, their new image format, on the Chromium blog. WebP is based on VP8's intra-frame coding and uses a container based on Resource Interchange File Format (RIFF).

== Comparison with H.264 ==
While H.264/MPEG-4 AVC contains patented technology and requires licenses from patent holders and limited royalties for hardware, Google has irrevocably released the VP8 patents it owns under a royalty-free public license.

According to a comparison of VP8 (encoded with the initial release of libvpx) and H.264 conducted by StreamingMedia, it was concluded that "H.264 may have a slight quality advantage, but it's not commercially relevant" and that "Even watching side-by-side (which no viewer ever does), very few viewers could tell the difference". They also stated that "H.264 has an implementation advantage, not a technology advantage."

Google claims that VP8 offers the "highest quality real-time video delivery" and Libvpx includes a mode where the maximum CPU resources possible will be used while still keeping the encoding speed almost exactly equivalent to the playback speed (realtime), keeping the quality as high as possible without lag. On the other hand, a review conducted by streamingmedia.com in May 2010 concluded that H.264 offers slightly better quality than VP8.

In September 2010 Fiona Glaser, a developer of the x264 encoder, gave several points of criticism for VP8, claiming that its specification was incomplete, and the performance of the encoder's deblocking filter was inferior to x264 in some areas. In its specification, VP8 should be a bit better than H.264 Baseline Profile and Microsoft's VC-1. Encoding is somewhere between Xvid and VC-1. Decoding is slower than FFmpeg's H.264, but this aspect can hardly be improved due to the similarities to H.264. Compression-wise, VP8 offers better performance than Theora and Dirac. According to Glaser, the VP8 interface lacks features and is buggy, and the specification is not fully defined and could be considered incomplete. Much of the VP8 code is copy-pasted C code, and since the source constitutes the actual specification, any bugs will also be defined as something that has to be implemented to be in compliance.

In 2010, it was announced that the WebM audio/video format would be based on a profile of the Matroska container format together with VP8 video and Vorbis audio.

== See also ==
- List of open-source codecs
