= Comparison of radio systems =

Many of the world's radio stations broadcast in a variety of analog and digital formats. This page will list and compare them in chart form.

== Table ==
World radio systems (Terrestrial)
System	Type	Modulation	Data rate	Sidebands?	Ch. Bandwidth (KHz)	Radio spectrum	Sound Codec	Digital subchannels	SFN	Metadata/RDS/RBDS
AM radio	Analog radio	Amplitude modulation	N/A	?	18–20 kHz	148.5-283.5 kHz (Longwave); 510–1610 kHz (Europe); 510–1710 kHz (USA and Canada)	N/A	N/A	No	None
Motorola C-QUAM	Analog radio (AM stereo)	QAM	N/A	?	18–20 kHz	510–1610 kHz (Europe; 510–1710 kHz (USA and Canada)	N/A	N/A	No	None
DAB	Digital radio	OFDM (DQPSK)	around 1000 kbit/s (4 channels up to 256 kbit/s)	?	1500 kHz	VHF-High/174-240 MHz, L-band/1452-1492 MHz	MPEG-Layer 2	Yes, typically 4-6 "stations" per channel	Yes	Yes
DAB^{+}	Digital radio	OFDM (DQPSK)	up to 256 kbit/s	?	1500 kHz	VHF-High/174-240 MHz, L-band/1452-1492 MHz	HE-AAC	No	Yes	Yes
Digital Radio Mondiale	Digital radio	COFDM (QAM)	up to 72 kbit/s	?	4.5–5 kHz (hybrid mode), 9–10 kHz, 18-20 kHz	510-1610 kHz (Europe), 510–1710 kHz (USA and Canada), SW, LW	MPEG-4 HE-AAC/CELP/HVXC	Yes, via IBOC	No?	Yes
FM radio	Analog radio	Frequency Modulation	N/A	?	200 kHz	87.5-108 MHz, 76-90 MHz (Japan), 65.8-74 MHz (USSR)	N/A	N/A	None	Yes (depending on station)
HD Radio	Hybrid/Digital radio	COFDM-HDC (SBR)	up to 60 kbit/s on AM, up to 300 kbit/s on FM	?	20–30 kHz on AM band ±5 kHz (on adjacent channel), up to 400 kHz on FM band (2 full FM channels)	510–1710 kHz, 87.5-108 MHz	HDC	up to 7 (3 full-power, 4 low-power) subchannels (FM)	No?	Yes
