= Nero Digital =

Nero Digital is a brand name applied to a suite of MPEG-4-compatible video and audio compression codecs developed by Nero AG of Germany and Ateme of France. The audio codecs are integrated into the Nero Digital Audio+ audio encoding tool for Microsoft Windows, and the audio & video codecs are integrated into Nero's Recode DVD ripping software.

Nero certifies certain DVD player/recorder devices as Nero Digital compatible, and licenses the codec technology to integrated circuit manufacturers.

The video codecs were developed by Ateme, and according to an interview with Nero AG developer Ivan Dimkovic, the audio codecs are improved versions of Dimkovic's older PsyTEL AAC Encoder. The audio codec is now available as a free stand-alone package called Nero AAC Codec.

== Functionality ==
Nero Digital can generate streams in the 3GP/MPEG-4 Part 14 (".mp4") container format and includes two video and two audio codecs:

- ASP (one of about 20 profiles defined in MPEG-4 Part 2)
- AVC (also known as MPEG-4 Part 10 or H.264)
- AAC-LC (the most widely used AAC profile defined in MPEG-4 Part 3)
- HE-AAC (defined in MPEG-4 Part 3, sometimes referenced as "aacPlus" or other, similar trademarks)

The codecs are compliant with the ISO/IEC standard, with the exception of subtitles and chapter information. The video streams generated by Nero Digital can be played back on some stand-alone hardware players and software media players such as the company's own Nero Showtime.

Recode cannot rip copy protected DVDs, but is able to import decrypted DVD images for encoding. Nero Digital also does not ship its codecs as stand-alone DirectShow or VfW modules, preventing them from being used for general-purpose video editing. The product is not bundled with a video editor.

== Comparisons with other video codecs (2003-2005) ==
The Nero Digital video codecs have been featured in video compression comparisons:

- In the 2003 Doom9 codec comparison, the ASP codec was the fastest of all the codecs, but fared relatively poorly in quality.
- The Nero Digital AVC codec was pronounced the winner of the 2004 Doom9 codec comparison. ND ASP did not compete.
- In the 2005 Doom9 codec comparison, the ASP codec was still the fastest and fared better than previously in quality, but not well enough to make it to the finals. The AVC codec came in second overall.
- In May 2005, it won the C't magazine video codec quality comparison, competing against other AVC codecs such as x264, VideoSoft's codec, the MainConcept codec and the Sorenson codec.
- Nero Digital AVC also won an informal 2005 'Movie Metric Benchmark challenge,' with up to a 1dB quality gain over DivX at the same bitrate.

== See also ==
- List of multimedia codecs
