= Nero AAC Codec =

Audio codec

- Developer: Nero AG
- Release: 1 May 2006; 20 years ago
- Final release: 1.5.4.0 (See table below) / February 18, 2010; 16 years ago
- Operating system: Windows, Linux
- Platform: IA-32
- Size: 2.1 MB
- Available in: English
- Type: Encoder/Decoder/Metadata Tool
- License: Freeware
- Website: https://web.archive.org/web/20160310025758/http://www.nero.com:80/enu/company/about-nero/nero-aac-codec.php

Nero AAC Codec is a set of software tools for encoding and decoding Advanced Audio Coding (AAC) format audio, and editing MPEG-4 metadata. It was developed and distributed by Nero AG, and is available at no cost for Windows and Linux for non-commercial use. The codec was originally part of Nero Digital, but was later released as a stand-alone package.

Nero's AAC encoder has been very competitive when tested against other encoders in scientific listening tests, for a time, second only to Apple's AAC encoder.

In 2006, Chip Magazine (Germany) found that AAC files encoded with the Nero AAC encoder would consume as little as half of the space on a portable music player when compared to MP3 files of similar audio quality.

== Components and Capabilities ==
The current package is labeled version "1.5.1.0", but contains the following three utilities:

Tool	Role	Latest version
neroAacEnc	AAC encoder	1.5.4.0 (Feb 18 2010)
neroAacDec	AAC decoder	1.5.1.0 (Dec 17 2009)
neroAacTag	MP4 metadata editor	1.5.1.0 (Dec 17 2009)

The encoder and decoder support MPEG-4 AAC LC, HE-AAC (AAC LC + SBR), and HE-AACv2 (LC + SBR + PS) Audio Object Types. Sample rates up to 96 kHz, and multichannel audio up to six channels (5.1 surround) are supported.

The metadata utility can read and write Nero Digital, iTunes, and Memory Stick format tags to MPEG-4 containers.

These command-line tools are commonly used by shell scripts and programs like ABCDE, Exact Audio Copy and foobar2000 to convert audio to AAC.

== History ==
The codec was originally part of Nero Digital, a complete MPEG-4 Audio/Video solution. The ASP/AVC (video) codec was developed by a French company called Ateme. Nero built an in-house team to develop the AAC (audio) codec that included Ivan Dimkovic, Menno Bakker, and others. Dimkovic was the author of the PsyTel codec, and the Nero AAC codec is said to be based on this work. Menno Bakker was the developer of FAAC, one of the earliest widely available AAC encoders, and also what would become its companion decoder, FAAD. The Nero AAC codec became a stand-alone package around 2006, although still called Nero Digital Audio until 2009. Nero apparently still uses the codec in its products. Neither Dimkovic nor Bakker currently work at Nero, and development of the codec has stalled, but the software is stable and remains a reliable, and high-quality, option for AAC encoding.

== See also ==
- Fraunhofer FDK AAC
- FAAC
