= SAOL =

SAOL may stand for:

- Svenska Akademiens ordlista, the normative dictionary for Swedish
- Structured Audio Orchestra Language, a computer language for describing audio effects, part of MPEG-4
- Saol, a free monthly newspaper in the Irish language
