= AMSS =

AMSS may refer to:

- Metropolitan Area of San Salvador (Área Metropolitana de San Salvador)
- Amarchand & Mangaldas & Suresh A Shroff & Co, an Indian law firm
- Amplitude modulation signalling system, a digital system for adding information to AM broadcast signals
- Ainsworth's Maternal Sensitivity Scale, a measure of maternal sensitivity
- Aeronautical mobile-satellite service
- Auto-Moto Association of Serbia, an FIA member organisation
