= Mp3PRO =

Obsolete variant of the MP3 audio format

mp3PRO is an unmaintained proprietary audio compression codec that combines the MP3 audio format with the spectral band replication (SBR) compression method. At the time it was developed it could reduce the size of a stereo MP3 by as much as 50% while maintaining the same relative quality. This works, fundamentally, by discarding the higher half of the frequency range and algorithmically replicating that information while decoding.

The technology behind SBR was developed by the former Swedish company Coding Technologies AB (acquired by Dolby Laboratories in 2007) in the late 1990s. It was included in their MPEG-2 AAC derived codec aacPlus, which would later be standardized as MPEG-4 HE-AAC. Thomson Multimedia (now Technicolor SA) licensed the technology and used it to extend the MP3 format, for which they held patents, hoping to also extend its profitable lifetime. This was released as mp3PRO in 2001.

It was originally claimed that mp3PRO files were compatible with existing MP3 decoders, and that the SBR data could simply be ignored. The reality was that MP3 players lacking specific mp3PRO decoding capability experienced a significant reduction in audio quality when playing mp3PRO files as only the lower half of the original frequency range is available.

mp3PRO development has been abandoned. The format was never standardized and there is no publicly available reference source code or documentation in existence. A very old software encoder/player exists, but is not maintained. Nero's Soundtrax application, bundled in the Nero Multimedia Suite, is capable of encoding and decoding this format into several others. Some versions of the outdated MusicMatch Jukebox player (which will still run even on Windows 10 x64) were able to decode and encode this format, too. In the early 2000s, mp3PRO was usable in several portable music players and in popular music software, but its market share has deteriorated rapidly. The codec itself is largely surpassed in quality and efficiency, as well as device and application support, by modern codecs like AAC and its HE-AAC variants which employ the same SBR method.

== Thomson Demo mp3PRO Player ==
Thomson Demo mp3PRO Player/Encoder is an unmaintained proprietary freeware media software program originally released by Thomson (now Technicolor SA) and Coding Technologies (acquired by Dolby Laboratories in 2007) which converts Waveform Audio File Format (WAV) files to mp3PRO.

The official website claims that nearly 50% more music, compared to standard MP3, can be held by a storage device whether CD, hard drive, or flash drive. The quality of 64 kbit/s mp3PRO technology is stated to be in the range between 96 and 128 kbit/s MP3.

This demo provides playback as well as compression capabilities. This specific demo program performs one WAV file to mp3PRO conversion at a time. Batch conversion is not available. Files must be 16bit PCM/WAV 44.1 kHz files.

The software, as well as the mp3PRO codec, has been unmaintained for more than a decade and is generally regarded as obsolete.
