= ULD =

ULD can refer to:

- Unit load device, a pallet or container used to load aircraft
- Ultra Low Delay Audio Coder
- Union of Liberian Democrats, political party in Liberia
- Unverricht–Lundborg disease
