= AAC-LD =

Audio compression standard

The MPEG-4 Low Delay Audio Coder (a.k.a. AAC Low Delay, or AAC-LD) is an audio compression standard designed to combine the advantages of perceptual audio coding with the low delay necessary for two-way communication. It is closely derived from the MPEG-2 Advanced Audio Coding (AAC) standard. It was published in MPEG-4 Audio Version 2 (ISO/IEC 14496-3:1999/Amd 1:2000) and in its later revisions.

AAC-LD uses a version of the modified discrete cosine transform (MDCT) audio coding technique called the LD-MDCT. AAC-LD is widely used by Apple as the voice-over-IP (VoIP) speech codec in FaceTime.

== Real time CODEC requirements ==
The most stringent requirements are a maximum algorithmic delay of only 20 ms and a good audio quality for all kind of audio signals including speech and music.

- The AAC-LD coding scheme bridges the gap between speech coding schemes and high quality audio coding schemes.

Two-way communication with AAC-LD is possible on usual analog telephone lines and via ISDN connections. It can use a bit rate of 32 - 64 kbit/s or higher. Compared to known speech coders, the codec is capable of coding both music and speech signals with good quality. Unlike speech coders, however, the achieved coding quality scales up with bitrate. Transparent quality can be achieved.

AAC-LD can also process stereo signals by using the advanced stereo coding tools of AAC. Thus it is possible to transmit a stereo signal with a bandwidth of 7 kHz via one ISDN line or with a bandwidth of 15 kHz via two ISDN lines.

== See also ==
- Advanced Audio Coding (parent technology)
- Opus an alternative codec for similar applications with lower delay and no licensing costs
- MP3 (related older technology)
- G.729 (ITU-T's teleconferencing audio codec)
- Ultra Low Delay Audio Coder ULD Audio codec (alternative technology also developed by Fraunhofer)
