= Single Channel Simulcast =

Simultaneous transmission of AM and Digital Radio Mondiale signals

Single/Multi Channel Simulcast is the simultaneous transmission of an amplitude modulated and Digital Radio Mondiale (DRM) in the same (SingleChannel Simulcast - SCS) or a neighbouring channel (MultiChannel Simulcast - MCS).

To produce this SCS multiplex signal, the initial carrier is modulated by the DRM signal using quadrature phase modulation. This FM signal is then modulated as if it were a normal AM carrier, thus producing two modes on the single signal.

Clearly the advantage of this is that both DRM and analogue radios can receive a signal they can discriminate and demodulate, with little disadvantage to either mode.

It can, however, decrease DRM range, and the phase changes in the carrier can induce local oscillator interference in the AM receiver, which will show as white noise.

== See also ==
- In-band on-channel
