= Amplitude modulation signalling system =

The amplitude modulation signalling system (AMSS or the AM signalling system) is a digital system for adding low bit rate information to an analogue amplitude modulated broadcast signal in the same manner as the Radio Data System (RDS) for frequency modulated (FM) broadcast signals.

This system has been standardized in March 2006 by ETSI (TS 102 386) as an extension to the Digital Radio Mondiale (DRM) system.

== Broadcasting ==
AMSS data are broadcast from the following transmitters:

- SW
  - BBC World Service: 15.575 MHz

Formerly it was also used by:

- LW
  - RTL France: 234 kHz
- MW
  - Truckradio 531 kHz
  - BBC World Service: 648 kHz
  - Deutschlandradio Kultur: 990 kHz
