= High-Efficiency Advanced Audio Coding =

Audio codec

- Filename extensions: MPEG/3GPP container: .m4a, .mp4, .3gp; Apple container: .m4a, .m4b, .m4p, .m4r, .m4v; ADTS stream (not raw, contains headers): .aac
- Internet media type: audio/aac audio/aacp audio/3gpp audio/3gpp2 audio/mp4
- Developed by: ISO
- Type of format: Audio compression format
- Contained by: MPEG-4 Part 14, 3GP and 3G2, ISO base media file format, Audio Data Interchange Format (ADIF), Audio Data Transport Stream (ADTS)
- Extended from: AAC
- Standard: ISO/IEC 14496-3

Hierarchical structure of AAC profile, HE-AAC profile and HE-AAC v2 profile, and compatibility between them. The HE-AAC profile decoder is fully capable of decoding any AAC profile stream. Similarly, The HE-AAC v2 decoder can handle all HE-AAC profile streams as well as all AAC profile streams. Based on the MPEG-4 Part 3 technical specification.

Evolution from MPEG-2 AAC-LC (Low Complexity) Profile and MPEG-4 AAC-LC Object Type to HE-AAC v2 Profile

High-Efficiency Advanced Audio Coding (HE-AAC) is an audio coding format for lossy data compression of digital audio as part of the MPEG-4 standards. It is an extension of Low Complexity AAC (AAC-LC) optimized for low-bitrate applications such as streaming audio.

The usage profile HE-AAC v1 uses spectral band replication (SBR) to enhance the modified discrete cosine transform (MDCT) compression efficiency in the frequency domain. The usage profile HE-AAC v2 couples SBR with Parametric Stereo (PS) to further enhance the compression efficiency of stereo signals.

HE-AAC is defined as an MPEG-4 Audio profile in ISO/IEC 14496–3. HE-AAC is used in digital radio standards like HD Radio, DAB+ and Digital Radio Mondiale.

== History ==
The progenitor of HE-AAC was developed by Coding Technologies by combining MPEG-2 AAC-LC with a proprietary mechanism for spectral band replication (SBR), to be used by XM Radio for their satellite radio service. Subsequently, Coding Technologies submitted their SBR mechanism to MPEG as a basis of what ultimately became HE-AAC.

HE-AAC v1 was standardized as a profile of MPEG-4 Audio in 2003 by MPEG and published as part of the ISO/IEC 14496-3:2001/Amd 1:2003 specification.

The HE-AAC v2 profile was standardized in 2006 as per ISO/IEC 14496-3:2005/Amd 2:2006.

Parts of the HE-AAC specification had previously been standardized and published by various bodies in 3GPP TS 26.401 , ETSI TS 126 401 V6.1.0 , ISO/IEC 14496-3:2001/Amd.1:2003 and ISO/IEC 14496-3:2001/Amd 2:2004.

At the time, Coding Technologies had already begun using the trade names AAC+ and aacPlus for what is now known as HE-AAC v1, and aacPlus v2 and eAAC+ for what is now known as HE-AAC v2.

== Perceived quality ==
Testing indicates that material decoded from 64 kbit/s HE-AAC does not quite have similar audio quality to material decoded from MP3 at 128 kbit/s using high quality encoders. The test, taking bitrate distribution and RMSD into account, is a tie between mp3PRO, HE-AAC and Ogg Vorbis.

Further controlled testing by 3GPP during their revision 6 specification process indicates that HE-AAC and HE-AAC v2 provide "Good" audio quality for music at low bit rates (e.g., 24 kbit/s).

In 2011, a public listening test comparing the two best-rated HE-AAC encoders at the time to Opus and Ogg Vorbis indicated that Opus had statistically significant superiority at 64 kbit/s over all other contenders. Apple's implementation of HE-AAC was ranked second. Ogg Vorbis and Nero HE-AAC tied for third place.

MPEG-2 and MPEG-4 AAC-LC decoders without SBR support will decode the AAC-LC part of the audio, resulting in audio output with only half the sampling frequency, thereby reducing the audio bandwidth. This usually results in the high-end, or treble, portion of the audio signal missing from the audio product.

== Support ==
=== Encoding ===
Orban Opticodec-PC Streaming and File Encoders were the first commercially available encoders supporting AAC-LC/HE-AAC back in 2003. They are now deprecated and replaced with StreamS Encoders from StreamS/Modulation Index with many more features, including support xHE-AAC/Unified Speech and Audio Coding. They are now in use at some of the largest content providers, and are considered to be the standard of the industry for live encoding.

Sony supports HE-AAC encoding since SonicStage version 4.

iTunes 9 supports HE-AAC encoding and playback.

Nero has released a free-of-charge command line HE-AAC encoder, Nero AAC Codec, and also supports HE-AAC inside the Nero software suite.

Sorenson Media's Squeeze Compression Suite includes an HE-AACv1 encoder and is available for macOS as well as Windows.

The 3GPP consortium released source code of a reference HE-AACv2 encoder that appears to offer competitive quality.

Winamp Pro also supports ripping music to HE-AAC. Using a transcoding plugin for Winamp's media library, any file can be transcoded to HE-AAC.

XLD, a macOS audio encoding program, offers encoding from any of its supported formats to HE-AAC.

Nokia PC Suite may encode audiofiles to eAAC+ format before transmitting them to mobile phone.

HE-AAC v1 and v2 encoders are provided by the Fraunhofer FDK AAC library in Android 4.1 and later versions.

FAAC version 2.0.0 and newer supports HE-AACv1 encoding.

=== Decoding ===
HE-AAC is supported in the open source FAAD/FAAD2 decoding library and all players incorporating it, such as VLC media player, Winamp, foobar2000, Audacious Media Player and SonicStage.

The Nero AAC Codec supports decoding HE and HEv2 AAC.

HE-AAC is also used by AOL Radio and Pandora Radio clients to deliver high-fidelity music at low bitrates.

iTunes 9.2 and iOS 4 include full decoding of HE-AAC v2 parametric stereo streams.

- iTunes 9 thru 9.1, iPhone OS 3.1 and Fall 2009 iPods have support for HE-AAC playback for version 1 with no parametric stereo.
- Older versions of Apple iTunes, iPod Touch, and iPhone will play HE-AAC files at reduced fidelity because they ignore the spectral-band replication and parametric stereo information, instead playing them as though they were standard AAC-LC files without the high-frequency, or "treble," information that is only present in the SBR part of the signal. These will report the track length as twice its actual length.

Dolby released Dolby Pulse decoders and encoders in September 2008. HE-AAC v2 is the core of Dolby Pulse so files and streams encoded in Dolby Pulse will playback on AAC, HE-AAC v1 and v2 decoders. Conversely files and streams encoded in AAC, HE-AAC v1 or v2 will playback on Dolby Pulse decoders.

Dolby Pulse provides the following additional capabilities beyond HE-AAC v2:

- Ability to intelligently generate and insert reversible loudness normalization and dynamic range metadata into the encoded file/stream; this metadata can then be used to optimize the playback experience based on application and/or device.
- Ability to insert custom metadata into the encoded file, and extract this metadata on playback

Dolby has additionally released a PC decoder as an SDK suitable for integration into PC applications requiring Dolby Pulse, HE-AAC or AAC playback capabilities.

HE-AAC v2 decoders are provided in all versions of Android. Decoding is handled by Fraunhofer FDK AAC since Android version 4.1.

=== Clients ===
Application	Platform	Description
AIMP	Windows	A Winamp-like alternative music player
Adobe Flash Player	Windows, macOS, ChromeOS, Linux	Browser plug-in Supports AAC+ from any RTMP source. Live streams wrapped in an ADTS container are not natively supported and have to be re-wrapped. (e.g. Icecast KH can serve streams in a .flv container, which is compatible with Flash.) (Note: To deliver streaming audio, AAC data is most likely carried in either the Audio Data Interchange Format (ADIF) or via Audio Data Transport Stream (ADTS). These containers can be parsed to create FLV audio tags in order to use the audio file with Data Generation Mode.)
Amarok (software)	Windows, Linux	Open-source music player
Audacious Media Player	Windows, Linux	Open-source music player
Deadbeef	Linux, Android	Open-source music player
Die Plattenkiste	Windows	Freeware internet radio application (in German)
foobar2000	Windows	Freeware music player
fre:ac	Windows, macOS, Linux	Open-source audio converter
FStream	macOS, iOS	Internet radio application
GuguRadio	iOS	Internet radio application
Internet Radio Player	Android	Internet radio player
Internet Radio Box	iOS	Internet radio application
iTunes	Windows, macOS	Freeware music player. Pre-installed on Mac computers
JetAudio	Windows, Android	Shareware media player
MediaHuman Audio Converter	Windows, macOS	Freeware audio converter (Supports conversion of MP3, AAC, AIFF, WAV etc.)
MPlayer	Windows, macOS and Linux	Open-source media player
Mpv (media player)	Windows, macOS and Linux	Open-source media player
Rockbox	Various portable media devices	Alternate firmware for various portable media-players, such as Apple iPod and Creative Zen
QuickTime X	macOS	Media player pre-installed on Mac OS X Snow Leopard or later
RealPlayer	Windows, macOS, Linux, Android	Freemium media player (HE-AAC v2 will only play in mono.)
Rhythmbox	Linux	Open-source music player
Snowtape	macOS	Shareware internet radio application
streamWriter	Windows	Open-source internet radio application
StreamS HiFi Radio	iOS	Paidware internet radio player
Tunein radio	iOS, Android, Windows Phone, Blackberry	Internet radio player
VLC media player	Windows, macOS, Linux, iOS, Android	Open-source media player
Winamp	Windows, macOS, Android	Freeware media player
XiiaLive	Android, iOS	Internet radio player
Kodi	Windows, Linux, macOS, Android	Open-source media player
Media Player Classic	Windows	Open-source media player

== Promotion aspects ==
=== Commercial trademarks and labeling ===
HE-AAC is marketed under the trademark aacPlus by Coding Technologies and under the trademark Nero Digital by Nero AG. Sony Ericsson, Nokia and Samsung use AAC+ to label support for HE-AAC v1 and eAAC+ to label support for HE-AAC v2 on their phones. Motorola uses AAC+ to indicate HE-AAC v1 and "AAC+ Enhanced" to indicate HE-AAC v2.

=== Licensing and patents ===
Companies holding patents for HE-AAC have formed a patent pool administered by Via Licensing Corporation to provide a single point of license for product makers.

Patent licenses are required for end-product companies that make hardware or software products that include HE-AAC encoders and/or decoders. Unlike the MP3 format before April 23, 2017, content owners are not required to pay license fees to distribute content in HE-AAC.

== Standards ==
HE-AAC profile was first standardized in ISO/IEC 14496-3:2001/Amd 1:2003. HE-AAC v2 profile (HE-AAC with Parametric Stereo) was first specified in ISO/IEC 14496-3:2005/Amd 2:2006. The Parametric Stereo coding tool used by HE-AAC v2 was standardized in 2004 and published as ISO/IEC 14496-3:2001/Amd 2:2004.

The current version of the MPEG-4 Audio (including HE-AAC standards) is published in ISO/IEC 14496-3:2009.

Enhanced aacPlus is required audio compression format in 3GPP technical specifications for 3G UMTS multimedia services and should be supported in IP Multimedia Subsystem (IMS), Multimedia Messaging Service (MMS), Multimedia Broadcast/Multicast Service (MBMS) and Transparent end-to-end Packet-switched Streaming Service (PSS). HE-AAC version 2 was standardized under the name Enhanced aacPlus by 3GPP for 3G UMTS multimedia services in September 2004 (3GPP TS 26.401).

HE-AAC and HE-AAC v2 audio coding for DVB applications is standardized by TS 101 154. AacPlus v2 by Coding Technologies is also standardized by the ETSI as TS 102 005 for Satellite services to Handheld devices (DVB-SH) below 3 GHz.

In December 2007, Brazil started broadcasting terrestrial DTV standard called International ISDB-Tb that implements video coding H.264 with audio AAC-LC on main program (single or multi) and video H.264 with audio HE-AACv2 in the 1Seg mobile sub-program.

=== Versions ===
The following is the summary of the different versions of HE-AAC:

Version	Common trade names	Codec feature	Standards
HE-AAC v1	aacPlus v1, eAAC, AAC+, CT-aacPlus	AAC-LC + SBR	ISO/IEC 14496-3:2001/Amd 1:2003
HE-AAC v2	aacPlus v2, eAAC+, AAC++, Enhanced AAC+	AAC-LC + SBR + PS	ISO/IEC 14496-3:2005/Amd 2:2006
xHE-AAC	aacPlus v2, eAAC+, AAC++, Enhanced AAC+	AAC-LC + SBR + PS + USAC	ISO/IEC 23003-3:2012/Amd 2:2012

- LC means low complexity
- SBR means spectral band replication
- PS means parametric stereo
- USAC means unified speech and audio coding

== See also ==
- Advanced Audio Coding
- Digital Radio Mondiale
