= MPEG-D =

Group of standards for audio coding

MPEG-D is a group of standards for audio coding formally known as ISO/IEC 23003 - MPEG audio technologies, published since 2007.

MPEG-D consists of four parts:

- MPEG-D Part 1: MPEG Surround (a.k.a. Spatial Audio Coding)
- MPEG-D Part 2: Spatial Audio Object Coding (SAOC)
- MPEG-D Part 3: Unified speech and audio coding
- MPEG-D Part 4: Dynamic Range Control
- MPEG-D Part 5: Uncompressed audio in MPEG-4 File Format

== See also ==
- ISO/IEC JTC 1/SC 29
