= Lars Liljeryd =

Lars "Stockis" Liljeryd (1951-2020) was a Swedish audio and medical engineer, inventor, and entrepreneur. He is noted for his pioneering work in the development of the audio compression technology called AAC, which revolutionized audio processing in portable music, video, and streaming media devices. He was one of the founders of the startup company called Coding Technologies.

Liljeryd was also a musician.

== Biography ==
Liljeryd was born in 1951 in Stockholm, Sweden. He began his career as a recording engineer. His break came after a North Sea oil exploration team sought his help to clarify divers’ communication underwater. For this project, Liljeryd developed a digital pitch-shifter that transformed the helium-induced high pitched squeaks of the divers back to comprehensible levels so that they are able to communicate better with team members on the surface. This technology launched his interest and success in digital audio compression.

Liljeryd developed the RX4000, a plate reverberation, for Stocktronics. Clients that purchased this system include the Swedish Naval Diving Center at Berga and the Norwegian DDVS Norskald.

=== New audio compression technology ===
In 1988, Liljeryd also invented a method that clarified sound and picture information electronically, including the approach that carry out the process. This technology eliminated undesirable intermodulation products, providing a linear amplitude ratio. The technique improved on the previous technology of compressing audio formats using “perceptual audio coding”, which eliminated parts of the original file that are missed by the human ear. The original process, however, was complicated. To address this, Liljeryd introduced the compression technology that shrinks files through the elimination of high-pitched components and recreating these from information contained in low frequencies. This technology called AACPlus was introduced in 2001 and became the basis of the MPEG-4 High Efficiency AAC, which was standardized in 2003. For his work on HE-AAC, Liljeryd - together with Kristofer Kjörling, and Martin Dietz - received the IEEE Masaru Ibuka Consumer Electronics Award in 2013.

Liljeryd was a finalist in the European Inventor Award 2017 for developing a new method of compressing digital audio files called Spectral Band Replication (SBR). This concept, which was produced into a real-world application by a team of engineers, improved existing coding formats such as MP3 and the Advanced Audio Coding (AAC). This technology allowed better and more affordable digital audio compression, addressing the challenges that came with limited bandwidth and storage space.

=== Adoption ===
Through Coding Technologies, Liljeryd’s techniques had been adopted by mobile phone operators, XM Satellite Radio, and the team behind the Motion Picture Experts Group (MPEG), among others. The company was also helping China build a digital multimedia platform that will serve as their alternative to DVD.

In the medical field, Liljeryd was part of the group of inventors who developed the non-linear glucose transform (NLGT), a system that provides accurate representation of glycemic information.

=== Music career ===
Liljeryd also played drums. In 1980, he participated as engineer and percussionist on the Hans Edler album Jukebox Graffiti Vol. 4 on the Europe Record label.
