= Ultra Low Delay Audio Coder =

The Ultra Low Delay Audio Coder (ULD) is a development of the Fraunhofer Institute for Digital Media Technology (IDMT), which is headed by one of the fathers of MP3, Karlheinz Brandenburg, and of the Fraunhofer Institute for Integrated Circuits (IIS). The ULD is a lossy audio data compression scheme that only introduces a very small amount of delay into the audio signal compared to commonly known audio coders like MP3 or AAC. This property is especially useful for communication purposes (like voice calls, video conferencing or making music via the internet), for which not only high compression ratios are necessary, but low latency is critical, too.
