= Structured Audio Orchestra Language =

- Paradigm: Imperative programming
- Family: MUSIC-N
- First appeared: 1999
- Filename extensions: .saol
- Website: www.saol.net

Structured Audio Orchestra Language (SAOL) is an imperative, MUSIC-N programming language designed for describing virtual instruments, processing digital audio, and applying sound effects. It was published as subpart 5 of MPEG-4 Part 3 (ISO/IEC 14496-3:1999) in 1999.

As part of the MPEG-4 international standard, SAOL is one of the key components of the MPEG-4 Structured Audio toolset, along with:

- Structured Audio Score Language (SASL)
- Structured Audio Sample Bank Format (SASBF)
- The MPEG-4 SA scheduler
- MIDI support

== See also ==
- Csound
- MPEG-4 Structured Audio
