= MPEG-4 Structured Audio =

Audio Encoding Standard

MPEG-4 Structured Audio is an ISO/IEC standard for describing sound. It was published as subpart 5 of MPEG-4 Part 3 (ISO/IEC 14496-3:1999) in 1999.

It allows the transmission of synthetic music and sound effects at very low bit rates (from 0.01 to 10 kbit/s), and the description of parametric sound post-production for mixing multiple streams and adding effects to audio scenes. It does not standardize a particular set of synthesis methods, but a method for describing synthesis methods.

The sound descriptions generate audio when compiled (or interpreted) by a compliant decoder. MPEG-4 Structured Audio consists of the following major elements:

- Structured Audio Orchestra Language (SAOL), an audio programming language. SAOL is historically related to Csound and other so-called Music-N languages. It was created by MIT Media Lab grad student Eric Scheirer while he was studying under Barry Vercoe during the 1990s.
- Structured Audio Score Language (SASL) - is used to describe the manner in which algorithms described in SAOL are used to produce sound.
- Structured Audio Sample Bank Format (SASBF) - allows for the transmission of banks of audio samples to be used in 'wavetable' sample-based synthesis (based on SoundFont and DownLoadable Sounds)
- A normative Structured Audio scheduler description - it is the supervisory run-time element of the Structured Audio decoding process.
- MIDI support - provides important backward-compatibility with existing content and authoring tools.

MPEG-4 Structured Audio was cited by CNN as one of the top-25 innovations to arise at the Media Laboratory.

== See also ==
- MPEG-4
