= Unified Speech and Audio Coding =

Audio compression standard

Unified Speech and Audio Coding (USAC) is an audio compression format and codec for both music and speech or any mix of speech and audio using very low bit rates between 12 and 64 kbit/s. It was developed by Moving Picture Experts Group (MPEG) and was published as an international standard ISO/IEC 23003-3 (a.k.a. MPEG-D Part 3) and also as an MPEG-4 Audio Object Type in ISO/IEC 14496-3:2009/Amd 3 in 2012.

It uses time-domain linear prediction and residual coding tools (ACELP-like techniques) for speech signal segments and transform coding tools (MDCT-based techniques) for music signal segments and it is able to switch between the tool sets dynamically in a signal-responsive manner. It is being developed with the aim of a single, unified coder with performance that equals or surpasses that of dedicated speech coders and dedicated music coders over a broad range of bitrates. Enhanced variations of the MPEG-4 Spectral Band Replication (SBR) and MPEG-D MPEG Surround parametric coding tools are integrated into the USAC codec.

== Extended HE-AAC ==
The MPEG-D USAC standard (ISO/IEC 23003-3) defines the Extended High Efficiency AAC profile, which contains all of the tools of the HE-AAC v2 profile plus the mono/stereo capabilities of the Baseline USAC profile. As a result, a decoder built according to the Extended High Efficiency AAC profile is able to also decode the bit streams created for the previous AAC family profiles. The Extended High Efficiency AAC profile was designed for applications relying on a consistent performance at low data rates while being able to decode all existing AAC-LC, HE-AAC and HE-AACv2 content.

== xHE-AAC ==
Logo for xHE-AAC used by Fraunhofer

Fraunhofer has defined the xHE-AAC codec as the combination of the Extended High Efficiency AAC profile and appropriate parts of the MPEG-D DRC Loudness Control Profile or Dynamic Range Control Profile. xHE-AAC extends the operating range of the codec from 12 to 300 kbit/s for stereo signals and allows seamless switching between bitrates over this range for adaptive bitrate delivery (using standards such as MPEG-DASH or HLS for example). xHE-AAC also includes MPEG-D DRC mandatory loudness control to play back content at a consistent volume and offers new dynamic range control profiles for listening in noisy situations.

While xHE-AAC decoders will be able to decode the bit streams created for the previous AAC family profiles, xHE-AAC encoders are typically intended for encoding of MPEG-D USAC audio object type (AOT 42) with MPEG-D DRC loudness metadata, though some may support encoding legacy AAC object types.

xHE-AAC is a mandatory audio codec in the Digital Radio Mondiale standard and is a trademark of Fraunhofer.

In April 2016, Via Licensing announced the launch of a xHE-AAC patent pool licensing program for 2016. In 2018, xHE-AAC was included in Via Licensing's AAC patent pool at no additional cost.

In January 2021, Fraunhofer announced a test service and trademark program for xHE-AAC and announced that the codec is being used by Netflix. Netflix reported that users switched from speakers to headphones 16% less often (due to poor sound quality or inadequate volume) on high dynamic range content when using xHE-AAC instead of HE-AAC. Netflix also explained that xHE-AAC allowed them to begin streaming with adaptive audio bitrates to Android devices. Fraunhofer also announced xHE-AAC licenses to MainConcept, Poikosoft, and LG. xHE-AAC is supported by the Bento4 DASH/HLS packager. In January 2022, MainConcept established a web encoding service to test xHE-AAC. In October 2022, xHE-AAC decoding was added to Windows 11 and Xbox devices.

=== Compatibility ===
xHE-AAC is supported in Android since Android 9 Pie and in iOS since iOS 13. It has been announced that it will be added to watchOS 7 and has been licensed to Microsoft. Playing xHE-AAC audio files is supported in foobar2000 from version 2.25 onwards. In October 2022, Windows 11 added support for xHE-AAC in the 22H2 update.

== See also ==
- Opus (codec) – a royalty free alternative, low latency codec for a similar usage
