= Nero AG =

German software company

- Type: Joint-stock company
- Industry: Software development
- Founded: 1995; 31 years ago
- Headquarters: Karlsruhe, Germany
- Key people: Ingo Sesemann, CEO; Richard Lesser, Chairman of the supervisory board
- Revenue: € 31.427 million (2011)
- Net income: loss (€ 6.700 million) (2011)
- Number of employees: 135 (2026)
- Subsidiaries: Nero Inc., Nero K.K., Nero Ltd., Nero Development and Services GmbH, Nero EMEA Sales GmbH
- Website: www.nero.com

Nero AG (known as Ahead Software AG until 2005) is a German computer software company that is especially well known for its CD/DVD/BD burning suite, Nero Burning ROM. The company's main product is Nero 2019, a piece of software that comprises burning, file conversion, media management, and video editing functions and was updated on an annual basis, though new releases have not occurred for several years.

== History ==
Richard Lesser founded the company as Ahead Software GmbH in 1995. The company changed its name (and legal form) to Ahead Software AG in 2001, and again to Nero AG in 2005.

The Nero Group includes foreign subsidiaries in Glendale, California, United States (Nero Inc., founded in 2001), in Yokohama, Japan (Nero K.K., founded in 2004), and Hangzhou, China (Nero Ltd., founded in 2007). The USA and Japan operations are sales offices, while the Chinese subsidiary operates exclusively to provide internal development services for the company.

In May 2007, it was announced that the Luxembourg-based firm Agrippina International SàrL owned more than 25% of Nero AG shares.

In 2009, the company established two additional subsidiaries in Germany: Nero Development and Services GmbH and Nero EMEA Sales GmbH.

In 2014, the company moved the operations and headquarters of Nero AG, as well as of the two group companies Nero Development and Services GmbH and Nero EMEA Sales GmbH, to Karlsruhe.

== Products ==
From its beginnings selling a single software application for burning, the company says it has become a "leader in digital media technologies" that now sells a wide range of products. Nero sells its products directly as well as via hardware manufacturers that bundle them on PCs, hard disks, camcorders and other devices. Other companies also use Nero multimedia codecs, SDKs and programming interfaces.

In 2008, Nero expanded its product range for the first time beyond the well-known burning software. With Nero Move it, users were able to transfer photos, videos, and music from one device to another or to online communities like YouTube, Myspace, and the company's own multimedia community My Nero. With the Nero 9 multimedia suite, they could create, rip, burn, edit, save, and upload their music, video, and photo files. In June 2009, the company launched its Nero BackitUp & Burn product, which saved, burned, and restored data and helped protect users' digital content. The company extended the product with additional functions in the years following its launch and gave the user navigation around the various program elements a more unified look and feel.

As a product, Nero evolved from a pure burning program (Nero Burning ROM) to a multimedia software package. The software includes programs:

- for burning and packet writing (Nero Burning ROM)
- for ripping and converting multimedia content (Nero Recode)
- for displaying, managing, and streaming photos and multimedia content (Nero MediaHome) and
- for creating, editing, and transcoding video content and for burning video content to video discs with menus (Nero Video)

Along with Nero, Nero AG also developed SecurDiscs process, as well as the MPEG-4 compression technique Nero Digital together with Ateme corporation.

Nero BackItUp was initially included in the Nero suite of programs, it allows the user to create an automatic backup of their data and store it on external storage media or in the cloud. It was spun off in 2012, and is now available together with cloud-based storage as a subscription model. Android, iOS and Windows Phone apps are available for Nero BackItUp.

Along with BackItUp, Nero provides additional applications for mobile devices. These include NeroKwik for managing photo files, Nero AirBurn for burning files wirelessly, Nero MediaHome Receiver for streaming media from a PC to mobile devices, and Nero MediaHome WiFi Sync for wireless data synchronization.

Since the release of Version 11, Nero Cover Designer (for creating covers), Nero WaveEditor (for editing music files) and Nero SoundTrax (for mixing and digitalizing music tracks) are no longer included in the suite but can be downloaded free of charge from the company's website.

Some of the products in the suite can also be downloaded separately. These include Nero Burning ROM and Nero Video.

Nero has also launched a number of free mobile Nero Suite companions apps for iOS and Android like Nero AirBurn, Nero Streaming Player, 1001 TVs. The latest app is Nero KnowHow app a digital learning guide for users, available for iOS, Windows 10 and Android.

For 2023, Nero AG launched the Nero Lens (ai photo enhance app), Nero Muse (ai art generator app). Also they dive in AI, Nero AI web online tools for image edit.

For 2024, Nero AI Video Upscaler is released, a software on upscale video quality to 4k.

2024 June, Nero AG released new mobile app--Erasee AI.

In 2025, Nero Motion Tracker introduced the new Segment Tracking technology, improving object segmentation and tracking accuracy for video editing tasks such as blur, masking, and privacy protection.
