= Digital Radio Mondiale =

Digital radio broadcasting standard

Official DRM logo

Digital Radio Mondiale (DRM; mondiale being Italian and French for "worldwide") is a set of digital audio broadcasting technologies designed to work over the bands currently used for analogue radio broadcasting including AM broadcasting—particularly shortwave—and FM broadcasting. DRM is more spectrally efficient than AM and FM, allowing more stations, at higher quality, into a given amount of bandwidth, using xHE-AAC audio coding format. Various other MPEG-4 codecs and Opus are also compatible, but the standard now specifies xHE-AAC.

Digital Radio Mondiale is also the name of the international non-profit consortium that has designed the platform and is now promoting its introduction. Radio France Internationale, TéléDiffusion de France, BBC World Service, Deutsche Welle, Voice of America, Telefunken (now Transradio) and Thomcast (now Ampegon) took part at the formation of the DRM consortium.

The principle of DRM is that bandwidth is the limiting factor, and computer processing power is cheap; modern CPU-intensive audio compression techniques enable more efficient use of available bandwidth, at the expense of processing resources.

== Features ==
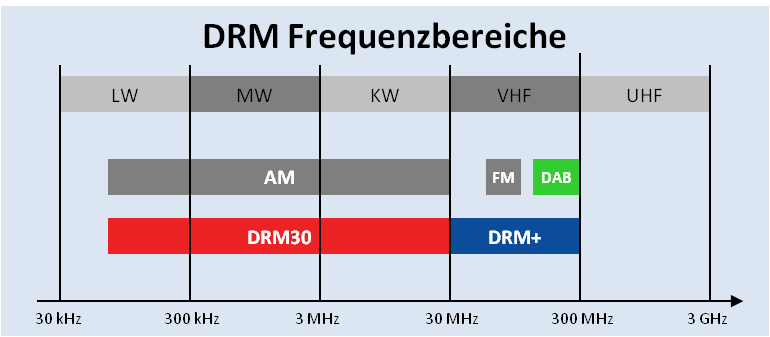
Comparing the frequency band used by DRM and other forms of audio broadcasting.

DRM can broadcast on frequencies below 30 MHz (long wave, medium wave and short wave), which allow for very-long-distance signal propagation. The modes for these lower frequencies were previously known as "DRM30". In the VHF bands, the term "DRM+" was used. DRM+ is able to use available broadcast spectra between 30 and 300 MHz; generally this means band I (47 to 68 MHz), band II (87.5 to 108 MHz) and band III (174 to 230 MHz). DRM has been designed to be able to re-use portions of existing analogue transmitter facilities such as antennas, feeders, and, especially for DRM30, the transmitters themselves, avoiding major new investment. DRM is robust against the fading and interference which often plague conventional broadcasting in these frequency ranges.

The encoding and decoding can be performed with digital signal processing, so that a low-cost embedded system with a conventional transmitter and receiver can perform the rather complex encoding and decoding.

As a digital medium, DRM can transmit other data besides the audio channels (datacasting) — as well as RDS-type metadata or program-associated data as Digital Audio Broadcasting (DAB) does. DRM services can be operated in many different network configurations, from a traditional AM one-service one-transmitter model to a multi-service (up to four) multi-transmitter model, either as a single-frequency network (SFN) or multi-frequency network (MFN). Hybrid operation, where the same transmitter delivers both analogue and DRM services simultaneously is also possible.

DRM incorporates technology known as Emergency Warning Features that can override other programming and activates radios which are in standby in order to receive emergency broadcasts.

== Status ==
The technical standard is available free-of-charge from the ETSI, and the ITU has approved its use in most of the world. Approval for ITU region 2 is pending amendments to existing international agreements. The inaugural broadcast took place on June 16, 2003, in Geneva, Switzerland, at the ITU's World Radio Conference.

Current broadcasters include Akashvani (formerly All India Radio), BBC World Service, Funklust (formerly known as Bit eXpress), Radio Exterior de España, Radio New Zealand International, Vatican Radio, Radio Romania International and Radio Kuwait.

Until now, DRM receivers have typically used a personal computer. Some manufacturers have introduced standalone DRM receivers, although these have remained niche products due to the limited availability of broadcasts. The transition of national broadcasters to DRM-based digital services, including All India Radio, is expected to influence the development of additional receiver models.

Chengdu NewStar Electronics is offering the DR111 from May 2012 on which meets the minimum requirements for DRM receivers specified by the DRM consortium and is sold worldwide.

The General Overseas Service of Akashvani broadcasts daily in DRM to Western Europe on 9.95 MHz at 17:45 to 22:30 UTC. All India Radio is in the process of replacing and refurbishing many of its domestic AM transmitters with DRM. The project which began in 2012 is scheduled to complete during 2015.

The British Broadcasting Corporation (BBC) has trialled the technology in the United Kingdom by broadcasting BBC Radio Devon in the Plymouth area in the MF band. The trial lasted for a year (April 2007 – April 2008). The BBC also trialed DRM+ in the FM band in 2010 from the Craigkelly transmitting station in Fife, Scotland, over an area which included the city of Edinburgh. In this trial, a 10 kW (ERP) FM transmitter was replaced with a 1 kW DRM+ transmitter in two different modes, and coverage compared with FM. Digital Radio Mondiale was included in the 2007 Ofcom consultation on the future of radio in the United Kingdom for the AM medium wave band.

RTÉ has also run single and multiple programme overnight tests during a similar period on the 252 kHz LW transmitter in Trim, County Meath, Ireland which was upgraded to support DRM after Atlantic 252 closed.

The Fraunhofer Institute for integrated circuits IIS offers a package for software-defined radios which can be licensed to radio manufacturers. Software package for car radios with DRM – Digital Radio Mondiale

The DRM standard is not permitted in the US on the mediumwave or the VHF bands since the FCC accepted HD Radio as standard for these bands. The shortwave band is not blocked, but is not used regularly.

=== International regulation ===
On 28 September 2006, the Australian spectrum regulator, the Australian Communications and Media Authority, announced that it had "placed an embargo on frequency bands potentially suitable for use by broadcasting services using Digital Radio Mondiale until spectrum planning can be completed" "those bands being "5,950–6,200; 7,100–7,300; 9,500–9,900; 11,650–12,050; 13,600–13,800; 15,100–15,600; 17,550–17,900; 21,450–21,850 and 25,670–26,100 kHz.

Since 2005, the United States Federal Communications Commission states in 47 CFR 73.758 that: "For digitally modulated emissions, the Digital Radio Mondiale (DRM) standard shall be employed." Part 73, section 758 is only for HF broadcasting.

== Technological overview ==
=== Audio source coding ===
Useful bitrates for DRM30 range from 6.1 kbit/s (Mode D) to 34.8 kbit/s (Mode A) for a 10 kHz bandwidth (±5 kHz around the central frequency). It is possible to achieve bit rates up to 72 kbit/s (Mode A) by using a standard 20 kHz (±10 kHz) wide channel. (For comparison, pure digital HD Radio can broadcast 20 kbit/s using channels 10 kHz wide and up to 60 kbit/s using 20 kHz channels.) Useful bitrate depends also on other parameters, such as:

- desired robustness to errors (error coding)
- power needed (modulation scheme)
- robustness in regard to propagation conditions (multipath propagation, doppler effect), etc.

When DRM was originally designed, it was clear that the most robust modes offered insufficient capacity for the then state-of-the-art audio coding format MPEG-4 HE-AAC (High Efficiency Advanced Audio Coding). Therefore, the standard launched with a choice of three different audio coding systems (source coding) depending on the bitrate:

- MPEG-4 HE-AAC (High Efficiency Advanced Audio Coding). AAC is a perceptual coder suited for voice and music and the High Efficiency is an optional extension for reconstruction of high frequencies (SBR: spectral bandwidth replication) and stereo image (PS: Parametric Stereo). 24 kHz or 12 kHz sampling frequencies can be used for core AAC (no SBR) which correspond respectively to 48 kHz and 24 kHz when using SBR oversampling.
- MPEG-4 CELP which is a parametric coder suited for voice only (vocoder) but that is robust to errors and needs a small bit rate.
- MPEG-4 HVXC which is also a parametric coder for speech programs that uses an even smaller bitrate than CELP.

However, with the development of MPEG-4 xHE-AAC, which is an implementation of MPEG Unified Speech and Audio Coding, the DRM standard was updated and the two speech-only coding formats, CELP and HVXC, were replaced. USAC is designed to combine the properties of a speech and a general audio coding according to bandwidth constraints and so is able to handle all kinds of programme material. Given that there were few CELP and HVXC broadcasts on-air, the decision to drop the speech-only coding formats has passed without issue.

Many broadcasters still use the HE-AAC coding format because it still offers an acceptable audio quality at bitrates above about 15 kbit/s. However, it is anticipated that in future, most broadcasters will adopt xHE-AAC.

DRM30, unlike HD Radio on the medium wave, allows multiprogramming.

=== Bandwidth ===
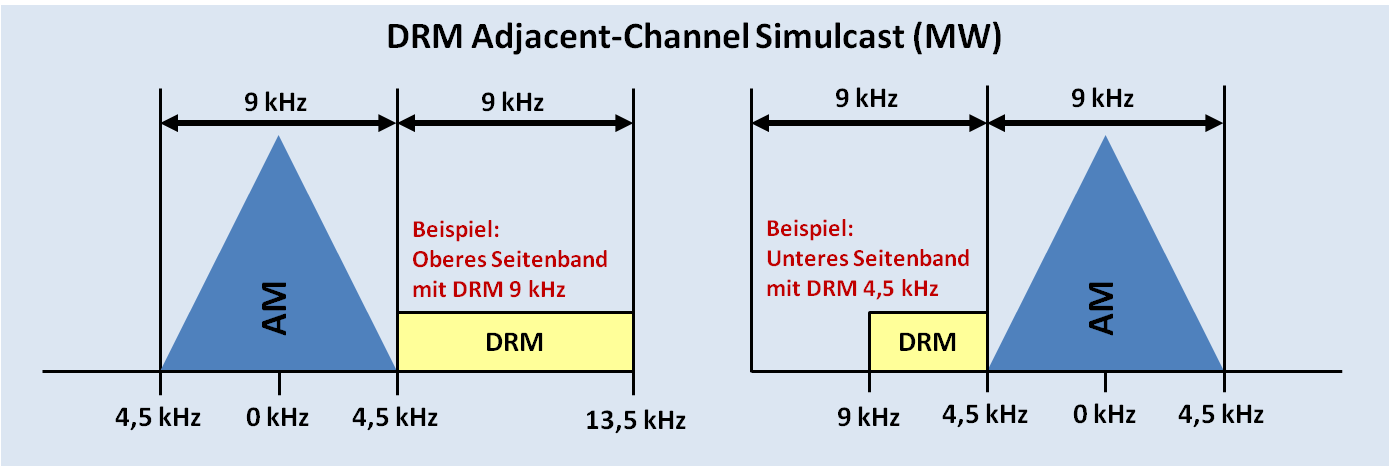
Two means of broadcasting DRM-AM hybrid, either using the full higher sideband or half of the lower sideband.

DRM broadcasting can be done using a choice of different bandwidths:

- 4.5 kHz. Gives the ability for the broadcaster to do a simulcast and use the lower-sideband area of a 9 kHz raster channel for AM, with a 4.5 kHz DRM signal occupying the area traditionally taken by the upper-sideband. However the resulting bit rate and audio quality is not good.
- 5 kHz. Gives the ability for the broadcaster to do a simulcast and use the lower-sideband area of a 10 kHz raster channel for AM, with a 5 kHz DRM signal occupying the area traditionally taken by the upper-sideband. However the resulting bit rate and audio quality is marginal (7.1–16.7 kbit/s for 5 kHz). This technique could be used on the shortwave bands throughout the world.
- 9 kHz. Occupies half the standard bandwidth of a region 1 long wave or medium wave broadcast channel.
- 10 kHz. Occupies half the standard bandwidth of a region 2 broadcast channel, and could be used to simulcast with analogue audio channel restricted to NRSC5. Occupies a full worldwide short wave broadcast channel (giving 14.8–34.8 kbit/s).
- 18 kHz. Occupies full bandwidth of region 1 long wave or medium wave channels according to the existing frequency plan. This offers better audio quality.
- 20 kHz. Occupies full bandwidth of region 2 or region 3 AM channel according to the existing frequency plan. This offers highest audio quality of the DRM30 standard (giving 30.6–72 kbit/s).
- 100 kHz for DRM+. This bandwidth can be used in band I, II, and III and DRM+ can transmit four different programs in this bandwidth or even one low definition digital video channel.

=== Modulation ===
The modulation used for DRM is coded orthogonal frequency division multiplexing (COFDM), where every carrier is modulated with quadrature amplitude modulation (QAM) with a selectable error coding.

The choice of transmission parameters depends on signal robustness wanted and propagation conditions. Transmission signal is affected by noise, interference, multipath wave propagation and Doppler effect.

It is possible to choose among several error coding schemes and several modulation patterns: 64-QAM, 16-QAM and 4-QAM. OFDM modulation has some parameters that must be adjusted depending on propagation conditions. This is the carrier spacing which will determine the robustness against Doppler effect (which cause frequencies offsets, spread: Doppler spread) and OFDM guard interval which determine robustness against multipath propagation (which cause delay offsets, spread: delay spread). The DRM consortium has determined four different profiles corresponding to typical propagation conditions:

- A: Gaussian channel with very little multipath propagation and Doppler effect. This profile is suited for local or regional broadcasting.
- B: multipath propagation channel. This mode is suited for medium range transmission. It is nowadays frequently used.
- C: similar to mode B, but with better robustness to Doppler (more carrier spacing). This mode is suited for long-distance transmission.
- D: similar to mode B, but with a resistance to large delay spread and Doppler spread. This case exists with adverse propagation conditions on very long-distance transmissions. The useful bit rate for this profile is decreased.

The trade-off between these profiles stands between robustness, resistance in regards to propagation conditions and useful bit rates for the service. This table presents some values depending on these profiles. The larger the carrier spacing, the more the system is resistant to Doppler effect (Doppler spread). The larger the guard interval, the greater the resistance to long multipath propagation errors (delay spread).

The resulting low-bit rate digital information is modulated using COFDM. It can run in simulcast mode by switching between DRM and AM, and it is also prepared for linking to other alternatives (e.g., DAB or FM services).

DRM has been tested successfully on shortwave, mediumwave (with 9 as well as 10 kHz channel spacing) and longwave.

Mode	OFDM carrier spacing (Hz)	Number of carriers				Symbol length (ms)	Guard interval length (ms)	Nb symbols per frame
Mode	OFDM carrier spacing (Hz)	9 kHz	10 kHz	18 kHz	20 kHz	Symbol length (ms)	Guard interval length (ms)	Nb symbols per frame
A	41.66	204	228	412	460	26.66	2.66	15
B	46.88	182	206	366	410	26.66	5.33	15
C	68.18	-	138	-	280	20.00	5.33	20
D	107.14	-	88	-	178	16.66	7.33	24

There is also a lower bandwidth two-way communication version of DRM as a replacement for SSB communications on HF - note that it is not compatible with the official DRM specification. It may be possible in some future time for the 4.5 kHz bandwidth DRM version used by the Amateur Radio community to be merged with the existing DRM specification.

The Dream software will receive the commercial versions and also limited transmission mode using the FAAC AAC encoder.

=== Error coding ===
Error coding can be chosen to be more or less robust.

This table shows an example of useful bitrates depending on protection classes:

- OFDM propagation profiles (A or B)
- carrier modulation (16QAM or 64QAM)
- and channel bandwidth (9 or 10 kHz)

Bitrates, kbit/s
Protection class	A (9 kHz)	B (9 kHz)	B (10 kHz)		C (10 kHz)		D (10 kHz)	
Protection class	64-QAM	16-QAM	16-QAM	64-QAM	16-QAM	64-QAM	16-QAM	64-QAM
0	19.6	7.6	8.7	17.4	6.8	13.7	4.5	9.1
1	23.5	10.2	11.6	20.9	9.1	16.4	6.0	10.9
2	27.8	-	-	24.7	-	19.4	-	12.9
3	30.8	-	-	27.4	-	21.5	-	14.3

The lower the protection class the higher the level of error correction.

== DRM+ ==
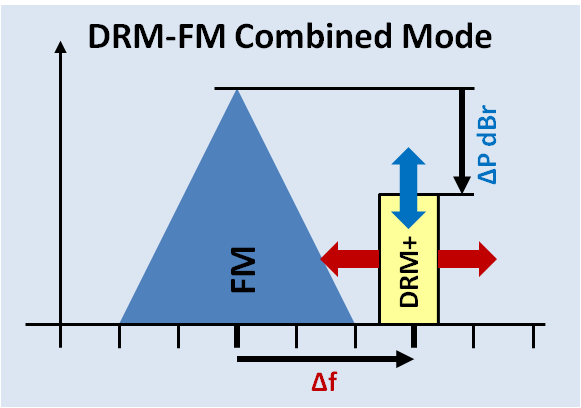
An example of a DRM-FM hybrid broadcast.

While the initial DRM standard covered the broadcasting bands below 30 MHz, the DRM consortium voted in March 2005 to begin the process of extending the system to the VHF bands up to 108 MHz.

On 31 August 2009, DRM+ (Mode E) became an official broadcasting standard with the publication of the technical specification by the European Telecommunications Standards Institute; this is effectively a new release of the whole DRM spec with the additional mode permitting operation above 30 MHz up to 174 MHz.

Wider bandwidth channels are used, which allows radio stations to use higher bit rates, thus providing higher audio quality. A 100 kHz DRM+ channel has sufficient capacity to carry one low-definition 0.7 megabit/s wide mobile TV channel: it would be feasible to distribute mobile TV over DRM+ rather than DMB or DVB-H. However, DRM+ (DRM Mode E) as designed and standardized only provides bitrates between 37.2 and 186.3 kbit/s depending on robustness level, using 4-QAM or 16-QAM modulations and 100 kHz bandwidth.

DRM+ bitrates [kbit/s]
Mode	MSC modulation	Robustness level	bitrate [kbit/s] for 100 kHz Bandwidth
E	4-QAM	Max	37.2
E	4-QAM	Min	74.5
E	16-QAM	Max	99.4
E	16-QAM	Min	186.3

DRM+ has been successfully tested in all the VHF bands, and this gives the DRM system the widest frequency usage; it can be used in band I, II (FM-band) and III. DRM+ can coexist with DAB in band III. The ITU has published three recommendations on DRM+, known in the documents as Digital System G. This indicates the introduction of the full DRM system (DRM 30 and DRM+). ITU-R Rec. BS.1114 is the ITU recommendation for sound broadcasting in the frequency range 30 MHz to 3 GHz. DAB, HD-Radio and ISDB-T were already recommended in this document as Digital Systems A, C and F, respectively.

In 2011, the pan-European organisation Community Media Forum Europe has recommended to the European Commission that DRM+ should rather be used for small scale broadcasting (local radio, community radio) than DAB/DAB+.

== See also ==
- AMSS AM signalling system
- Digital Audio Broadcasting (DAB)
- Digital Multimedia Broadcasting (DMB)
- DVB-H (Digital Video Broadcasting - Handhelds)
- DVB-T (Digital Video Broadcasting - Terrestrial)
- ETSI Satellite Digital Radio (SDR)
- HD Radio, North American system for digital radio
- ISDB-Tsb, Japanese system for digital radio.
- Cliff effect, which affects digital communications such as radio
- Shortwave Radio
- In-band on-channel
