= List of codecs =

List of computer file compression formats

The following is a list of compression formats and related codecs.

== Audio compression formats ==
=== Non-compression ===
- Linear pulse-code modulation (LPCM, generally only described as PCM) is the format for uncompressed audio in media files and it is also the standard for CD-DA; note that in computers, LPCM is usually stored in container formats such as WAV, AIFF, or AU, or as raw audio format, although not technically necessary.
  - FFmpeg
- Pulse-density modulation (PDM)
  - Direct Stream Digital (DSD) is standard for Super Audio CD
    - foobar2000 Super Audio CD Decoder (based on MPEG-4 DST reference decoder)
    - FFmpeg (based on dsd2pcm)
- Pulse-amplitude modulation (PAM)

=== Lossless compression ===
- Actively used
  - Most popular
    - Free Lossless Audio Codec (FLAC)
      - libFLAC
      - FFmpeg
    - Apple Lossless Audio Codec (ALAC)
      - Apple QuickTime
      - libalac
      - FFmpeg
      - Apple Music
    - Monkey's Audio (APE)
      - Monkey's Audio SDK
      - FFmpeg (decoder only)
    - OptimFROG (OFR)
    - Tom's verlustfreier Audiokompressor (TAK)
      - TAK SDK
      - FFmpeg (decoder only)
    - WavPack (WV)
      - libwavpack
      - FFmpeg
    - True Audio (TTA)
      - libtta
      - FFmpeg
    - Windows Media Audio Lossless (WMAL)
      - Windows Media Encoder
      - FFmpeg (decoder only)
  - Other
    - DTS-HD Master Audio, also known as DTS++ and DCA XLL
      - libdca (decoder only)
      - FFmpeg (decoder only)
    - Dolby TrueHD – Standard for DVD-Audio in Blu-ray (mathematically based on MLP)
      - FFmpeg
    - Meridian Lossless Packing (MLP), also known as Packed PCM (PPCM) – Standard for DVD-Audio in DVD
      - FFmpeg
    - MPEG-4 Audio Lossless Coding (MPEG-4 ALS)
      - SSC, DST, ALS and SLS reference software (ISO/IEC 14496-5:2001/Amd.10:2007)
      - FFmpeg (decoding only)
    - MPEG-4 Scalable Lossless Coding (MPEG-4 SLS) – Parts of it are used in HD-AAC.
      - SSC, DST, ALS and SLS reference software (ISO/IEC 14496-5:2001/Amd.10:2007)
    - RealAudio Lossless
      - RealPlayer
      - FFmpeg (decoding only)
    - BFDLAC (BFD Lossless Audio Compression). Ongoing development.
      - FXpansion's BFD3 drum software. (2013-2017)
    - L2HC – Huawei
      - Huawei Music
      - NearLink
      - Huawei FreeBuds
  - Oddball
    - ATRAC Advanced Lossless (AAL) – Extremely unpopular
      - FFmpeg (lossy decoder only)
    - Direct Stream Transfer (DST) – Only used for Direct Stream Digital
      - SSC, DST, ALS and SLS reference software (ISO/IEC 14496-5:2001/Amd.10:2007)
      - FFmpeg (decoder only)
    - Original Sound Quality (OSQ) – Only used in WaveLab
      - FFmpeg (decoding only)
- Discontinued
  - Lossless Audio (LA) – No update for 10+ years
  - Shorten (SHN) – Officially discontinued.
    - libshn
    - FFmpeg (decoding only)
  - Lossless Predictive Audio Compression (LPAC) – Predecessor of MPEG-4 ALS
  - Lossless Transform Audio Compression (LTAC) – Predecessor of LPAC
  - MPEG-1 Audio Layer III HD (mp3HD) –Officially discontinued
  - RK Audio (RKAU) – Officially discontinued
    - FFmpeg (decoding only)

=== Lossy compression ===
- Discrete cosine transform (DCT)
  - Modified discrete cosine transform (MDCT, used in most of the audio codecs listed below)

==== General/Speech hybrid ====
- Unified Speech and Audio Coding (USAC, MPEG-D Part 3, ISO/IEC 23003-3)
  - exhale (encoder only; open source)
  - FFmpeg (decoder only; open source)
- IETF standards:
  - Opus (RFC 6716) – based on SILK vocoder and CELT codec
    - libopus
    - FFmpeg (decoding and experimental encoding)
- IETF Internet Draft
  - IPMR Speech Codec – used in Spirit DSP's TeamSpirit Voice&Video Engine
- Alliance for Open Media
  - Open Audio Codec (OAC; under-development)
    - liboac

==== Neural audio codecs ====
- Lyra (codec) – used in Google Duo
- Lyra V2 – based on SoundStream neural codec
- Satin (used by Microsoft Teams)
- Facebook EnCodec
- WavTokenizer

==== General ====
- Adaptive differential pulse-code modulation (ADPCM, also called adaptive delta pulse-code modulation)
- Adaptive Transform Acoustic Coding (ATRAC, used in MiniDisc devices)
  - FFmpeg (decoder only)
- ATSC/ETSI standards:
  - Dolby Digital (AC3, ATSC A/52, ETSI TS 102 366)
    - FFmpeg
    - liba52 (decoder only)
  - Dolby Digital Plus (E-AC-3, ATSC A/52:2012 Annex E, ETSI TS 102 366 Annex E)
    - FFmpeg
  - DTS Coherent Acoustics (DTS, Digital Theatre System Coherent Acoustics, ETSI TS 102 114)
    - FFmpeg
    - libdca (decoder only)
  - Dolby AC-4 (ETSI TS 103 190)
- Impala Blackbird audio codec
- ITU standards:
  - G.719
  - G.722
    - FFmpeg
  - G.722.1 (subset of Siren7) and G.722.1 Annex C (subset of Siren14)
    - libg722_1
    - libsiren (part of libmsn and msn-pecan)
  - G.722.2
    - 3GPP TS 26.173 – AMR-WB speech Codec (C-source code) – reference implementation
    - opencore-amr (decoder)
    - VisualOn AMR-WB encoder
    - FFmpeg (decoding only)
  - EVS
- MPEG-1 Audio and MPEG-2 Audio
  - layer I (MP1) (MPEG-1, MPEG-2 and non-ISO MPEG-2.5)
    - FFmpeg (decoder only)
  - layer II (MP2) (MPEG-1, MPEG-2 and non-ISO MPEG-2.5)
    - FFmpeg
    - tooLame (encoding only)
    - twoLame (encoding only)
  - layer III (MP3) (MPEG-1, MPEG-2 and non-ISO MPEG-2.5)
    - FFmpeg (decoding only)
    - LAME (encoding only)
  - Advanced Audio Coding (AAC) (MPEG-2 Part 7)
    - FAAC (encoder) and FAAD (decoder)
    - FFmpeg
    - iTunes
    - Nero AAC Codec
    - VisualOn AAC Encoder (a.k.a. libvo_aacenc)
    - Fraunhofer FDK AAC
    - libaacplus
- MPEG-4 Audio
  - Advanced Audio Coding (AAC, MPEG-4 Part 3 subpart 4), HE-AAC and AAC-LD
    - FAAC, FAAD2
    - FFmpeg
    - iTunes
    - Nero AAC Codec
    - MPEG-4 AAC reference software (ISO/IEC 14496-5:2001)
  - Harmonic and Individual Lines and Noise (HILN, MPEG-4 Parametric Audio Coding)
    - MPEG-4 reference software (ISO/IEC 14496-5:2001)
  - TwinVQ
    - MPEG-4 reference software (ISO/IEC 14496-5:2001)
    - FFmpeg (decoding only)
  - BSAC (Bit-Sliced Arithmetic Coding)
    - MPEG-4 reference software (ISO/IEC 14496-5:2001)
- MPEG-H
  - MPEG-H 3D Audio
- AITISA standards:
  - AVS3-P3 (T/AI 109.3)
- Musepack (a.k.a. MPEGplus)
  - Musepack SV8 Tools
  - FFmpeg (decoding only)
- NICAM
- AT&T Perceptual Audio Coder
- Precision Adaptive Subband Coding (PASC; a variant of MP1; used in Digital Compact Cassette)
- QDesign (purchased by DTS)
  - QDesign Music Codec – used in Apple QuickTime
    - FFmpeg (decoding only)
- PictureTel (purchased by Polycom)
  - Siren 7
    - libg722_1
    - libsiren (part of libmsn and msn-pecan)
    - FFmpeg (decoder only)
  - Siren 14
    - libg722_1
    - vgmstream (decoder only)
  - Siren 22
- NTT TwinVQ
  - FFmpeg (decoder only)
  - NTT TwinVQ Encoder, NTT TwinVQ Player
- Voxware MetaSound (a variant of NTT TwinVQ)
  - Windows Media Player (voxmsdec.ax)
  - FFmpeg (decoder only)
- Vorbis
  - aoTuV
  - FFmpeg
  - libvorbis
  - Tremor (decoder only)
- Windows Media Audio (WMA)
  - Windows Media Encoder
  - FFmpeg
  - ADC codec (Adaptive Differential Coding)
- Cook Codec (Cooker; RealAudio 6)
  - FFmpeg (decoder only)

===== AES3 =====
- SMPTE 302M
  - FFmpeg (decoder only)
- Dolby E
  - FFmpeg (decoder only)

===== Bluetooth =====
- Bluetooth Special Interest Group
  - Low Complexity Subband Coding (SBC)
    - BlueZ's SBC library (libsbc)
    - Fluoride Bluetooth stack (successor of BlueDroid)
    - FFmpeg
  - CVSD 8 kHz – used in Hands-Free Profile (HFP)
  - modified SBC (mSBC) – used in Hands-Free Profile (HFP)
    - BlueZ's SBC library (libsbc)
    - Fluoride Bluetooth stack
    - FFmpeg
  - SBC XQ
    - PulseAudio's bluetooth stack (encoder only)
    - PipeWire's bluetooth stack (encoder only)
  - LC3 (Low Complexity Communication Codec)
    - Google's liblc3 (open source) – used in Android 13 and later
- ETSI
  - LC3plus (ETSI TS 103 634)
    - Google's liblc3 (open source)
- Qualcomm Technologies International (formerly CSR)
  - aptX (a.k.a. apt-X)
    - Qualcomm libaptX
    - FFmpeg
  - aptX HD
    - Qualcomm libaptXHD
    - FFmpeg
  - aptX Low Latency
  - aptX Adaptive
  - FastStream – a variant of SBC codec for bi-directional audio transmission
- Sony
  - LDAC
    - libldac (encoder only) – used in Android Oreo
    - libldacdec (decoder only)
- HWA Alliance/Savitech
  - LHDC
    - HWA encoder/decoder
  - LLAC
    - HWA encoder/decoder
- HiBy
  - Ultra Audio Transmission (UAT)
- Samsung
  - Samsung HD/UHQ-BT codec
  - Samsung Scalable codec
  - Samsung Seamless codec
- MQA
  - MQair

===== Digital radio =====
- Hybrid Digital Coding – used in HD Radio (a.k.a. NRSC-5)
  - NRSC-5 receiver for rtl-sdr (decoder only)
  - gr-nrsc5 (encoder only)

==== Voice ====
(low bit rate, optimized for speech)

- Linear predictive coding (LPC, used in most of the speech codecs listed below)
  - Code-excited linear prediction (CELP)
    - Algebraic code-excited linear prediction (ACELP)
- Xiph.Org Foundation
  - Speex, patent free
    - libspeex
    - FFmpeg (decoder only)
- Dialogic ADPCM (VOX)
  - FFmpeg (decoder only)
- ITU standards:
  - G.711 (a-law and μ-law companding; 64 kbit/s), also known as PCM of voice frequencies
    - Sun Microsystems's public domain implementation
    - FFmpeg (libavcodec)
  - G.711.0 (G.711 LLC)
  - G.711.1 (Wideband extension for G.711; 64/80/96 kbit/s)
  - G.711.1D (Super-wideband extension for G.711.1; 96/112/128 kbit/s)
  - G.718 (8/12/16/24/32 kbit/s)
  - G.718B (Super-wideband extension for G.718; 28–48 kbit/s)
  - G.719
  - G.721 (superseded by G.726; 32 kbit/s)
    - Sun Microsystems's public domain implementation
  - G.722 (SB-ADPCM; 48/56/64 kbit/s)
    - FFmpeg
  - G.722B (Super-wideband extension for G.722; 64/80/96 kbit/s)
  - G.722.2 (AMR-WB)
    - 3GPP TS 26.173 – AMR-WB speech Codec (C-source code) – reference implementation
    - opencore-amr (decoder)
    - FFmpeg (decoder only)
  - G.723 (24 and 40 kbit/s DPCM, extension to G.721, superseded by G.726)
    - Sun Microsystems's public domain implementation
  - G.723.1 (MPC-MLQ or ACELP; 5.3/6.3 kbit/s)
    - FFmpeg
  - G.726 (ADPCM; 16/24/32/40 kbit/s)
    - Sun Microsystems's public domain implementation
    - FFmpeg (libavcodec)
  - G.727
    - Sun Microsystems's public domain implementation
  - G.728 (LD-CELP; 16 kbit/s)
    - FFmpeg (decoder only)
  - G.729 (CS-ACELP; 8 kbit/s)
    - FFmpeg (decoder only)
  - G.729a
  - G.729b
  - G.729ab
  - G.729d (6.4 kbit/s)
    - FFmpeg (decoder only)
  - G.729e (11.8 kbit/s)
  - G.729.1 (G.729 Annex J; Wideband extension for G.711; 8–32 kbit/s)
  - G.729.1E (Super-wideband extension for G.729.1)
- Google
  - internet Speech Audio Codec (iSAC)
    - WebRTC
- Nellymoser Asao Codec
  - FFmpeg (libavcodec)
- RealNetworks
  - RealAudio 1 (VSELP 14.4 kbit/s)
    - FFmpeg (decoder only)
  - RealAudio 2 (LD-CELP 28.8 kbit/s)
    - FFmpeg (decoder only)
- PictureTel PT716, PT716plus
- PictureTel PT724
- RTAudio – used by Microsoft Live Communication Server
- SVOPC – used by Skype
- OpenLPC – created by Future Dynamics
  - HawkVoice (libHVDI)
- ANSI/SCTE
  - ANSI/SCTE 24-21 2006 (BroadVoice16)
    - BroadVoice Speech Codec Open Source C Code
  - ANSI/SCTE 24-22 2013 (iLBCv2.0)
  - ANSI/SCTE 24-23 2007 (BroadVoice32)
    - BroadVoice Speech Codec Open Source C Code
- IETF RFCs:
  - Internet Low Bit Rate Codec (iLBC, RFC 3951) – developed by Global IP Solutions/Google
    - WebRTC
- IETF Internet Draft
  - SILK (used by Skype)
  - CELT (developed by Xiph.Org Foundation)
    - libcelt
- MPEG-4 Audio
  - MPEG-4 CELP
  - MPEG-4 HVXC
- Skyphone MPLP
- Inmarsat
  - INMARSAT-M IMBE
  - Inmarsat Mini-M AMBE
- Meta MLow – used in Instagram, Messenger, and WhatsApp.

===== Microsoft DirectPlay =====
Those codecs are used by many PC games which use voice chats via Microsoft DirectPlay API.

- Voxware MetaVoice
  - Windows Media Player (voxmvdec.ax)
- Truespeech
  - Windows Media Player (tssoft32.acm)
  - FFmpeg (decoder only)
- MS GSM
  - Windows Media Player (msgsm32.acm)
  - libgsm
  - FFmpeg (decoder only)
- MS-ADPCM
  - Windows Media Player (msadp32.acm)
  - FFmpeg

===== Digital Voice Recorder =====
- International Voice Association (IVA) standards:
  - Digital Speech Standard / Standard Play (DSS-SP)
    - FFmpeg (decoding only)
  - Digital Speech Standard / Quality Play (DSS-QP)
- Sony LPEC
- Truespeech Triple Rate CODER (TRC) – used in some pocket recorders
- Micronas Intermetall MI-SC4 – used by voice recorders such as RadioShack Digital Recorder and I-O DATA HyperHyde
  - FFmpeg (decoder only)
- Sanyo LD-ADPCM – used by Sanyo ICR series
  - FFmpeg (decoder only)

===== Mobile phone =====
====== Generation 2 ======
- European Telecommunications Standards Institute (ETSI) GSM
  - Full Rate (GSM 06.10, RPE-LTP)
    - libgsm
    - FFmpeg (decoder only)
  - Half Rate (GSM 06.20, VSELP 5.6 kbit/s)
  - Enhanced Full Rate (GSM 06.60, ACELP 12.20 kbit/s, compatible with AMR mode AMR_12.20)
- Telecommunications Industry Association (TIA) IS-95 (a.k.a. cdmaOne)
  - IS-96A (QCELP 8 kbit/s)
  - IS-127 (EVRC 8 kbit/s)
  - IS-733 (QCELP 13 kbit/s)
- Telecommunications Industry Association (TIA) IS-54/IS-136 (a.k.a. Digital AMPS)
  - IS-85 (VSELP 8kbit/s)
    - ITU-T G.191's IS-54 implementation
  - IS-641 (ACELP 7.4 kbit/s, compatible with AMR mode AMR_7.40)
- Association of Radio Industries and Businesses (ARIB) RCR STD-27 (PDC)
  - PDC-HR (PSI-CELP 3.45 kbit/s)
  - PDC-FR (VSELP 11.2 kbit/s)
  - PDC-EFR CS-ACELP 8 kbit/s (a.k.a. G.729)
  - PDC-EFR ACELP 6.7 kbit/s (compatible with AMR mode AMR_6.70)

====== Generation 3/4 ======
- 3rd Generation Partnership Project (3GPP)
  - Adaptive Multi-Rate (AMR)
    - AMR-NB
      - 3GPP TS 26.073 – AMR speech Codec (C-source code) – reference implementation
      - opencore-amr (one may compile ffmpeg with—enable-libopencore-amrnb to incorporate the OpenCORE lib)
      - FFmpeg (by default decoder only, but see above the compiling options to incorporate the OpenCORE lib)
    - AMR-WB
      - 3GPP TS 26.173 – AMR-WB speech Codec (C-source code) – reference implementation
      - opencore-amr (decoder), from OpenCORE (one may compile ffmpeg with—enable-libopencore-amrwb to incorporate the OpenCORE lib)
      - vo-amrwbenc (encoder), from VisualOn, included in Android (one may compile ffmpeg with—enable-libvo-amrwbenc to incorporate the VisualOn lib)
      - FFmpeg (by default decoder only, but see above the compiling options).
    - AMR-WB+
      - 3GPP TS 26.273 – AMR-WB+ speech Codec (C-source code) – reference implementation
    - Enhanced Voice Services (EVS)
      - 3GPP TS.26.443 – Codec for Enhanced Voice Services (EVS) – ANSI C code (floating-point)
- 3rd Generation Partnership Project 2 (3GPP2)
  - Enhanced Variable Rate Codec (EVRC, a.k.a. IS-127) – based on RCELP
    - FFmpeg (decoder only)
  - Enhanced Variable Rate Codec B (EVRC-B)
  - QCELP (Qualcomm code-excited linear prediction)
    - QCELP-8 (a.k.a. SmartRate or IS-96C)
      - FFmpeg (decoder only)
    - QCELP-13 (a.k.a. PureVoice or IS-733)
      - FFmpeg (decoder only)
  - Selectable Mode Vocoder (SMV)
  - Variable Multi Rate – WideBand (VMR-WB)

===== Professional mobile radio =====
- APCO
  - Project 25 Phase 2 Enhanced Full-Rate (AMBE+2 4400bit/s with 2800bit/s FEC)
  - Project 25 Phase 2 Half-Rate (AMBE+2 2450bit/s with 1150bit/s FEC) – also used in NXDN and DMR
    - mbelib (decoder only)
  - Project 25 Phase 1 Full Rate (IMBE 7200bit/s)
    - mbelib (decoder only)
- European Telecommunications Standards Institute (ETSI)
  - ETS 300 395-2 (TETRA ACELP 4.6kbit/s)
- TETRAPOL
  - RPCELP 6 kbit/s
- D-STAR Digital Voice (AMBE 2400bit/s with 1200bit/s FEC)
  - mbelib (decoder only)
- Professional Digital Trunking System Industry Association (PDT Alliance) standards:
  - NVOC – used in China
- Spirit DSP RALCWI
- DSPINI
  - SPR Robust
  - TWELP Robust
- Codec2
  - libcodec2
- RL-CELP (used in Japanese railways)

===== Military =====
- U.S. Department of Defense (DoD) Federal Standard:
  - FS-1015 (a.k.a. LPC-10)
    - HawkVoice (libHVDI)
  - FS-1016 (CELP)
    - HawkVoice (libHVDI)
  - FS-1023 (CVSD 12kbit/s)
- United States Military Standard (MIL-STD)
  - MIL-STD-188 113 (CVSD 16 kbit/s and 32 kbit/s)
    - SoX (libsox)
  - MIL-STD-3005 (a.k.a. MELP)
    - Texas Instruments' 2.4 kbit/s MELP Proposed Federal Standard speech coder
- NATO
  - STANAG 4198 (a.k.a. LPC-10e)
    - SpanDSP (open source)
  - STANAG-4591 (a.k.a. MELPe)
    - Microsoft Speech coder
- BBN NRV – developed in DARPA program

==== Video games ====
- Bink Audio, Smacker Audio
  - FFmpeg (decoder only)
- Actimagine (Nintendo European Research & Development) FastAudio
  - MobiclipDecoder (decoder only)
  - FFmpeg (decoder only)
- Nintendo GCADPCM (a.k.a. DSP ADPCM or THP ADPCM) – used in GameCube, Wii and Nintendo 3DS
  - vgmstream (decoder only)
  - VGAudio
  - FFmpeg (decoder only)
- Sony VAG (a.k.a. Sony PSX ADPCM)
  - vgmstream (decoder only)
  - FFmpeg (decoder only)
- Sony HEVAG – used in PS Vita.
  - vgmstream (decoder only)
- Sony ATRAC9 – used in PS4 and PS Vita
  - VGAudio (decoder only)
  - FFmpeg (decoder only)
- Microsoft XMA – WMA variants for Xbox 360 hardware decoding
  - FFmpeg (decoder only)
- Xbox ADPCM
  - vgmstream (decoder only)
  - FFmpeg (decoder only)
- CRI ADX ADPCM
  - vgmstream (decoder only)
  - VGAudio
  - FFmpeg
- CRI AHX
- CRI HCA/HCA-MX – used in CRI ADX2 middleware
  - vgmstream (decoder only)
  - VGAudio
  - FFmpeg (decoder only)
  - libcgss
  - HCADecoder (decoder only)
- FMOD FADPCM
  - vgmstream (decoder only)

== Text compression formats ==
- BiM
- Continuous Media Markup Language (CMML)
- MPEG-4 Part 17 (e.g. 3GPP Timed Text)
- ttyrec

== Video compression formats ==
=== Non-compression ===
- RGB 4:4:4 (only linear, transfer-converted and bit-reduced also sort of compression up to about 3:1 for HDR)
- YUV 4:4:4/4:2:2/4:1:1/4:2:0 (all lower 4:4:4 is spatially compressed up to 2:1 for 4:2:0 with specific colour distortions).
  - Intel IYUV
- 10-bit uncompressed video
- Composite digital signal – used by SMPTE D-2 and D-3 broadcast digital videocassettes
- Avid DNxUncompressed (SMPTE RDD 50)
- V210 – defined by Apple and used by Serial digital interface Input/output video cards

=== Analog signals ===
- PAL broadcast signal
  - Pyctools-PAL (open source)
- NTSC broadcast signal
  - gr-ntsc (open source)
- LaserDisc RF signal
  - ld-decode (open source)
- VHS / S-VHS / U-matic RF signal
  - VHS-Decode (open source)
- Composite Video Baseband Signal (CVBS)
  - VHS-Decode's CVBS-Decode (open source)

=== Lossless video compression ===
- ITU-T/ISO/IEC standards:
  - H.264 lossless
    - x264 (encoder only)
    - FFmpeg (decoder only, uses x264 for encoding)
    - NVDEC/NVENC (for NVIDIA GPU)
  - H.265 lossless
    - x265 (encoder only)
    - UHDcode (decoder only, uses x265 to read HEVC encoded files)
    - FFmpeg (decoder only, uses x265 for encoding)
    - NVDEC/NVENC (for NVIDIA GPU)
  - Motion JPEG 2000 lossless
    - libopenjpeg
  - JPEG XS lossless
    - FastTICO-XS
- IETF standards:
  - FFV1 (RFC 9043) – FFV1's compression factor is comparable to Motion JPEG 2000, but based on quicker algorithms (allows real-time capture). Written by Michael Niedermayer and published as part of FFmpeg under GNU LGPL.
    - FFmpeg (CPU/Vulkan)
- SMPTE standards:
  - VC-2 HQ lossless (a.k.a. Dirac Pro lossless)
    - libdirac
    - libschroedinger
- Alparysoft Lossless Video Codec (Alpary)
- Apple Animation (QuickTime RLE)
  - QuickTime
  - FFmpeg
- ArithYuv
- AV1
  - libaom
- AVIzlib
  - LCL (VfW codec) MSZH and ZLIB
  - FFmpeg
- Autodesk Animator Codec (AASC)
  - FFmpeg (decoder only)
- CAI Format
- CamStudio GZIP/LZO
  - FFmpeg (decoder only)
- Chennai Codec (EVX-1)
  - Cairo Experimental Video Codec (open source)
- Dxtory
  - FFmpeg (decoder only)
- FastCodec
- Flash Screen Video v1/v2
  - FFmpeg
- FM Screen Capture Codec
  - FFmpeg (decoder only)
- Fraps codec (FPS1)
  - FFmpeg (decoder only)
- Grass Valley Lossless
  - Grass Valley Codec Option
  - FFmpeg (decoder only)
- Huffyuv Huffyuv (or HuffYUV) was written by Ben Rudiak-Gould and published under the terms of the GNU GPL as free software, meant to replace uncompressed YCbCr as a video capture format. It uses very little CPU but takes a lot of disk space. See also ffvhuff which is an "FFmpeg only" version of it.
  - FFmpeg
- IgCodec
- Intel RLE
- innoHeim/Rsupport Screen Capture Codec
  - FFmpeg (decoder only)
- Lagarith A more up-to-date fork of Huffyuv is available as Lagarith
  - Lagarith Codec (VfW codec)
  - FFmpeg (decoder only)
- LOCO – based on JPEG-LS
  - FFmpeg (decoder only)
- MagicYUV
  - MagicYUV SDK
  - FFmpeg
- Microsoft RLE (MSRLE)
  - FFmpeg
- MSU Lossless Video Codec
- MSU Screen Capture Lossless
- CorePNG – based on PNG
  - FFmpeg
- ScreenPresso (SPV1)
  - FFmpeg (decoder only)
- ScreenPressor – a successor of MSU Screen Capture Lossless
  - FFmpeg (decoder only)
- SheerVideo
  - FFmpeg (decoder only)
- Snow lossless
  - FFmpeg
- TechSmith Screen Capture Codec (TSCC)
  - EnSharpen Video Codec for QuickTime
  - FFmpeg (decoder only)
- Toponoky
- Ut Video Codec Suite
  - libutvideo
  - FFmpeg
- VBLE
  - FFmpeg (decoder only)
- VP9 by Google
  - libvpx
  - FFmpeg (decoder only)
- YULS
- ZeroCodec
  - FFmpeg (decoder only)
- ZMBV (Zip Motion Block Video) Codec – used by DOSBox
  - FFmpeg

==== Lossless game codecs ====
- DXA
  - ScummVM Tools (encoder only)
  - FFmpeg (decoder only)

=== Lossy compression ===
- Discrete cosine transform (DCT, used in Digital Betacam and most of the video codecs listed below)

==== General ====
- ITU-T/ISO/IEC standards:
  - H.120
  - H.261 (a.k.a. Px64)
    - FFmpeg H.261 (libavcodec)
    - Microsoft H.263
  - MPEG-1 Part 2 (MPEG-1 Video)
    - FFmpeg
    - MainConcept MPEG-1
    - TMPGEnc
  - H.262/MPEG-2 Part 2 (MPEG-2 Video)
    - Canopus ProCoder
    - Cinema Craft Encoder
    - FFmpeg
    - InterVideo Video Decoder
    - MainConcept MPEG-2
    - Microsoft H.263
    - TMPGEnc
    - NVDEC (for NVIDIA GPU)
  - H.263
    - FFmpeg H.263 (libavcodec)
  - MPEG-4 Part 2 (MPEG-4 Advanced Simple Profile)
    - 3ivx
    - DivX
    - libavcodec
    - HDX4
    - Nero Digital
    - Xvid
  - H.264/MPEG-4 AVC or MPEG-4 Part 10 (MPEG-4 Advanced Video Coding), approved for Blu-ray
    - CoreAVC (decoder only; limited to below Hi10P profile)
    - MainConcept
    - Nero Digital
    - QuickTime H.264
    - Sorenson AVC Pro codec, Sorenson's new implementation
    - OpenH264 (baseline profile only)
    - x264 (encoder only; supports some of Hi422P and Hi444PP features)
    - FFmpeg (decoder only)
    - NVDEC/NVENC(for NVIDIA GPU)
  - MPEG-4 AVC variants:
    - MPEG-4 Web Video Coding or MPEG-4 Part 29 – a subset of MPEG-4 AVC baseline profile
    - XAVC
  - HEVC (High Efficiency Video Coding, H.265, MPEG-H part 2)
    - x265 (encoder only)
    - NVDEC/NVENC (for NVIDIA GPU)
  - Versatile Video Coding (H.266, VVC)
    - VVC Test Model (VTM reference software for VVC; open source)
    - Fraunhofer Versatile Video Decoder (open source; decoder only)
    - Fraunhofer Versatile Video Encoder (open source; encoder only)
    - FFmpeg (decoder only)
  - Video Coding for Browsers (VCB)/VP8 (MPEG-4 Part 31, ISO/IEC 14496-31, RFC 6386)
    - libvpx
    - FFmpeg
    - NVDEC (for NVIDIA GPU)
  - Internet Video Coding (ISO/IEC 14496-33, MPEG-4 IVC)
  - Essential Video Coding (EVC; MPEG-5 Part 1; under-development)
    - eXtra-fast Essential Video Encoder (open source; encoder only)
    - eXtra-fast Essential Video Decoder (open source; decoder only)
- IETF Internet Draft (NETVC)
  - xvc
    - Divideon's reference implementation (open source)
  - Thor (forms the basis of AV1)
    - Cisco's reference implementation (open source)
- SMPTE standards:
  - VC-1 (SMPTE 421M, subset of Windows Media Video)
    - FFmpeg (decoder only)
    - NVDEC (for NVIDIA GPU)
  - Dirac (SMPTE 2042-1)
    - Schrödinger
    - dirac-research
    - FFmpeg (decoder only)
- IEEE/GB standards:
  - Audio Video Standard (AVS)
    - AVS1-P2 (GB/T 20090.2-2006; IEEE 1857.3) – used in China Blue High-definition Disc
      - FFmpeg (decoding only)
    - AVS+ (AVS1-P16; GY/T 257.1-2012; GB/T 20090.16-2016)
      - FFmpeg (decoding only)
    - AVS1-P7 (AVS-M; under-development)
    - AVS2-P2 (GB/T 33475.2-2016; IEEE 1857.4)
      - uAVS2 Encoder
      - xavs2 (encoder only)
      - davs2 (libdavs2; decoder only)
    - AVS3-P2 (T/AI 109.2-2021; IEEE 1857.10)
      - uavs3e (encoder only)
      - uavs3d (decoder only)
- Alliance for Open Media
  - AV1 (AOMedia Video 1)
    - libaom
    - SVT-AV1
    - rav1e (encoder only)
    - dav1d (decoder only)
    - libgav1 (decoder only)
    - NVDEC (for NVIDIA GPU)
  - AV2 (AOMedia Video 2; under-development)
- Xiph.Org Foundation
  - Daala (under development, basis (alongside other formats) of AV1)
    - libdaala (open source)
  - Theora (based on VP3)
    - FFmpeg (decoding only)
    - libtheora (open source)
- Apple Video (Apple RPZA)
  - QuickTime
  - FFmpeg
- Blackbird FORscene video codec
- Firebird Original FORscene video codec
- Digital Video Interactive standards:
  - RTV 2.1 (a.k.a. Indeo 2)
    - FFmpeg (decoder only)
  - PLV (Production Level Video)
    - ActionMedia II driver (decoder only)
- Indeo 3/4/5
  - FFmpeg (decoder only)
- Microsoft Video 1 (MSV1, MS-CRAM, based on MotiVE)
  - FFmpeg (decoder only)
- Open Media Commons standards:
  - OMS Video (based on H.261)
- On2 Technologies TrueMotion VP3/VP4, VP5, VP6, VP7; under the name The Duck Corporation: TrueMotion S, TrueMotion 2, TrueMotion RT 2.0
  - FFmpeg (decoder only)
- RealVideo 1, G2, 8, 9 and 10
  - FFmpeg
  - RealMedia HD SDK
- RealVideo Fractal Codec (a.k.a. Iterated Systems ClearVideo)
  - FFmpeg (decoder only)
- RealMedia HD (a.k.a. RealVideo 11 or RV60)
  - RealMedia HD SDK
  - FFmpeg (decoder only)
- Snow Wavelet Codec
- Digital Subband Video 2 (Wavelet Codec)
- Sorenson Video, Sorenson Spark
  - FFmpeg
- VP9 by Google; VP10 was not released and instead was integrated into AV1
  - libvpx
  - FFmpeg
  - NVDEC (for NVIDIA GPU)
- Windows Media Video (WMV)
  - WAX (Part of the Windows Media Series)
  - FFmpeg

==== AI-based / AI-enhanced video codecs ====
- AIVC
- Deep Render codec
- MPAI
  - AI-Enhanced Video Coding (MPAI-EVC; under development)
  - AI-based End-to-End Video Coding (MPAI-EEV; under development)

==== Scalable / Layered ====
VP8, VP9, AV1, and H.266/VVC support scalable modes by default.

- ITU-T/ISO/IEC standards:
  - Scalable Video Coding (H.264/SVC; H.264/MPEG-4 AVC Annex G; an extension of H.264/MPEG-4 AVC)
  - Scalable High Efficiency Video Coding (SHVC; an extension of H.265/HEVC)
  - Low Complexity Enhancement Video Coding (LCEVC; MPEG-5 Part 2)
    - LCEVC Decoder SDK (open source; decoder only)
    - V-Nova LCEVC SDK
- SMPTE standards
  - VC-4 Layered Video Extension (SMPTE ST 2058-1:2011)

==== Intra-frame-only ====
- Motion JPEG
  - FFmpeg
  - Morgan Multimedia M-JPEG
  - Pegasus PICVideo M-JPEG
  - MainConcept M-JPEG
- ISO/IEC standard
  - Motion JPEG 2000 (ISO/IEC 15444-3, ITU-T T.802)
    - libopenjpeg
    - FFmpeg
    - Morgan Multimedia M-JPEG2000
    - Morgan Multimedia dcpPlayer (decoder only)
  - JPEG XS (ISO/IEC 21122) Lightweight Low latency video codec
    - intoPIX fastTICO-XS
  - DV (IEC 61834)
    - FFmpeg
  - MPEG-4 SStP (ISO/IEC 14496-2)
    - FFmpeg
  - Motion JPEG XR (ISO/IEC 29199-3, ITU-T T.833)
  - Animated JPEG XL (ISO/IEC 18181)
    - libjxl
- IETF standards:
  - Advanced Professional Video (AVP; RFC 9924)
    - OpenAPV (open source)
    - FFmpeg (CPU/Vulkan)
- Apple ProRes 422/4444
  - FFmpeg (CPU/Vulkan)
- Apple Intermediate Codec
  - FFmpeg (decoder only)
- Apple Pixlet
  - FFmpeg (decoder only)
- AVC-Intra
  - x264 (encoder only)
  - FFmpeg (decoder only)
- AVC-Ultra – a subset of MPEG-4 AVC Hi444PP profile
- XAVC-I
- PyroWave (Wavelet Codec)
- CineForm HD
  - CineForm-SDK – developed by GoPro (open source)
  - FFmpeg
- SMPTE standard
  - VC-2 SMPTE standard (a.k.a. Dirac Pro. SMPTE ST 2042)
    - Schrödinger
    - dirac-research
    - VC-2 Reference Encoder and Decoder – developed by BBC (open source)
    - FFmpeg (the encoder only supports VC-2 HQ profile)
  - VC-3 SMPTE standard (SMPTE ST 2019)
    - Avid DNxHD
    - FFmpeg
  - VC-5 SMPTE standard (SMPTE ST 2073; a superset of CineForm HD)
  - VC-6 SMPTE standard (SMPTE ST 2117-1)
    - V-Nova VC-6 SDK
- Grass Valley HQ/HQA/HQX
  - Grass Valley Codec Option
  - FFmpeg (decoder only)
- NewTek NT25
- NewTek SpeedHQ – used in Network Device Interface (NDI) protocol
  - NewTek Codec
  - FFmpeg

==== Stereoscopic 3D / Multiview ====
- Multiview Video Coding
- Multiview High Efficiency Video Coding (MV-HEVC; an extension of H.265/HEVC)
  - MainConcept MV-HEVC Encoder add-on
  - FFmpeg (decoder only)
  - x265 v4.0 or later (encoder only)
  - NVENC (for NVIDIA GPU)

==== Security and surveillance cameras ====
- Guobiao standards (GB/T)
  - AVS-S-P2 (suspended)
  - SVAC (GB/T 25724-2010)
- Infinity CCTV Codec (IMM4/IMM5/IMM6)
  - FFmpeg

==== CD-ROM or CD-related video codecs ====
- CDXL codec
  - FFmpeg (decoder only)
- Cinepak (a.k.a. Apple Compact Video)
  - FFmpeg
- Photo CD codec
  - FFmpeg (decoder only)
- MotionPixels – used in MovieCD
  - FFmpeg (decoder only)
- CD+G (CD+Graphics) codec
  - FFmpeg (decoder only)
  - VLC (decoder only)
- CD+EG (CD+Extended Graphics) codec

==== Network video codecs ====
- SMPTE RDD
  - LLVC (Low Latency Video Codec; SMPTE RDD 34) – used in Networked Media Interface (NMI; SMPTE RDD 40)
- HEVC-SCC (Screen Content Coding Extensions)
  - x265 v4.0 or later (encoder only)
  - FFmpeg (decoder only)
- ZRLE (RFC 6143 7.7.6) – used by VNC
- Sun Microsystems's CellB video (RTP playload type 25) – used in Solaris's SunVideo Plus and Lawrence Berkeley National Laboratory's vic (Video Conferencing Tool)
- Xerox PARC's Network Video (nv; RTP playload type 28) – used in Xerox's nv and Lawrence Berkeley National Laboratory's vic (Video Conferencing Tool)
- CU-SeeMe video codec
- GoToMeeting codec
  - FFmpeg (decoder only)
- Microsoft
  - RemoteFX codec (used in MS-RDPRFX, an extension of Remote Desktop Protocol)
  - NSCodec Bitmap Codec (used in MS-RDPNSC, an extension of Remote Desktop Protocol)

==== Screen-capture video codecs ====
- Microsoft Camcorder Video (based on the GDI interface) – used in Microsoft Office 97's Microsoft Camcorder
- VMnc VMware screen codec (based on the RFB protocol of VNC) – used by VMware Workstation
  - vmnc.dll
  - FFmpeg (decoder only)

==== Bayer/Compressed RAW video codecs ====
- CinemaDNG (created by Adobe; used in Blackmagic cameras)
- Redcode RAW (used in RED cameras) – a modified version of JPEG 2000
  - libredcode
- ArriRaw (used in Arri cameras)
- Cineform RAW (used in Silicon Imaging cameras)
  - CineForm-SDK
- Blackmagic RAW (used in Blackmagic cameras)
  - Blackmagic RAW SDK
- Cintel RAW (used in Cintel Scanner)
  - FFmpeg (decoder only)
- Apple ProRes RAW
  - FFmpeg (decoder only; CPU/Vulkan)
- intoPIX TICO RAW
  - intoPIX fastTICO-RAW SDK & TICO-RAW FPGA/ASIC libraries
- Canon CRX – used in Canon Cinema Raw Light movie
  - Canon RAW Plugin for Avid Media Access
  - LibRaw (decoder only; open source)
- Sony X-OCN

==== Video games ====
- Bink Video, Smacker video
  - FFmpeg
  - libavcodec
- Nintendo Mobiclip video codec
  - FFmpeg (decoder only)
- CRI Sofdec codec – a MPEG variant with 11-bit DC and color space correction; used in Sofdec middleware
- CRI P256 – used in Sofdec middleware for Nintendo DS
- Indeo Video Interactive (aka Indeo 4/5) – used in PC games for Microsoft Windows
  - FFmpeg (decoder only)
  - Intel Indeo Video

==== Real-time ====
- RivaTuner video codec (RTV1/RTV2)
  - FFmpeg (RTV1 decoder only)
- Hap/Hap Alpha/Hap Q
  - VIDVOX hap codec
  - FFmpeg
- DXV Codec
  - Resolume DXV Codec
  - FFmpeg
- NotchLC
  - FFmpeg (decoder only)
- VESA Display Stream Compression (DSC)
- VESA Display Compression-M (VDC-M)

== Point-cloud compression formats ==
- MPEG-I
  - Video-based Point Cloud Compression (V-PCC; MPEG-I Part 5)
  - Geometry-based Point Cloud Compression (G-PCC; MPEG-I Part 9; ISO/IEC CD 23090-9)
  - Enhanced G-PCC (MPEG-I Part 38; ISO/IEC CD 23090-38)

== Polygonal-mesh compression formats ==
- MPEG-4
  - 3D Mesh Compression (3DMC) in MPEG-4 Visual, Version 2 (ISO/IEC 14496-2)
  - 3D Mesh Compression Extension (3DMCe; MPEG-4 Part 16 Animation Framework eXtension (AFX) Amendment 1)
  - Frame-based Animated Mesh Compression (FAMC; MPEG-4 Part 16 Animation Framework eXtension (AFX) Amendment 2)
  - Scalable Complexity 3D Mesh Compression (SC3DMC; MPEG-4 Part 16 Animation Framework eXtension (AFX) Amendment 3)
    - Open3DGC (open source)
  - Pattern-based 3D mesh coding (PB3DMC; MPEG-4 Part 16 Animation Framework eXtension (AFX) Amendment 4)
- Alliance for Open Media (VVM Working Group)
  - Polygonal Mesh Coding (PMC; under-development)
- Sun Microsystems
  - 3D Geometry Compression – used in Java 3D and HoloWeb (one of the proposals for VRML 2.0)
- Google
  - Draco – used in glTF and Universal Scene Description
    - libdraco (open source)
- meshopt (KHR_meshopt_compression in glTF)
  - meshoptimizer (open source)

== See also ==
- List of data compression algorithms
- List of open-source codecs
- Comparison of video codecs
- Comparison of audio coding formats
- Comparison of video container formats
- Comparison of graphics file formats
- Comparison of video player software
- RTP payload formats
