= ISO base media file format =

Multimedia container format

ISO base media file format (MPEG-4 Part 12)
- Developed by: ISO, IEC
- Initial release: February 2004; 22 years ago
- Latest release: ISO/IEC 14496-12:2026; April 2026; 1 month ago
- Type of format: Container format
- Container for: Audio, video, text, data
- Extended from: QuickTime File Format
- Extended to: MP4, 3GP, 3G2, .mj2, .dvb, .dcf, .m21, .f4v, HEIF
- Standard: ISO/IEC 14496-12
- Open format?: No
- Free format?: No
- Website: www.iso.org/standard/85596.html

The ISO base media file format (ISOBMFF) is a container file format that defines a general structure for files that contain time-based multimedia data such as video and audio. It is standardized in ISO/IEC 14496-12, a.k.a. MPEG-4 Part 12, and was formerly also published as ISO/IEC 15444-12, a.k.a. JPEG 2000 Part 12.

It is designed as a flexible, extensible format that facilitates interchange, management, editing and presentation of the media. The presentation may be local, or via a network or other stream delivery mechanism. The file format is designed to be independent of any particular network protocol while enabling support for them in general.

The format has become very widely used for media file storage and as the basis for various other media file formats (e.g. the MP4 and 3GP container formats), and its widespread use was recognized by a Technology & Engineering Emmy Award presented on 4 November 2021 by the National Academy of Television Arts and Sciences.

== History ==
The ISO base media file format is directly based on Apple's QuickTime container format. It was developed by MPEG (in ISO/IEC JTC 1/SC 29, originally Working Group 11 MPEG, currently Working Group 3 MPEG Systems). The first MP4 file format specification was created on the basis of the QuickTime format specification published in 2001. The MP4 file format known as "version 1" was published in 2001 as ISO/IEC 14496-1:2001, as revision of the MPEG-4 Part 1: Systems. In 2003, the first version of the MP4 file format was revised and replaced by MPEG-4 Part 14: MP4 file format (ISO/IEC 14496-14:2003), commonly known as MPEG-4 file format "version 2".

The MP4 file format was generalized into the ISO base media file format (ISO/IEC 14496-12:2004 or ISO/IEC 15444-12:2004), which defines a general structure for time-based media files. It is used as the basis for other file formats in the family such as MP4, 3GP, and Motion JPEG 2000).

Historically, the text was also published as ISO/IEC 15444-12 (JPEG 2000 Part 12), although the JPEG 2000 version of the standard was withdrawn in January 2017 since it was redundant with the MPEG-4 publication.

MPEG-4 Part 12 / JPEG 2000 Part 12 editions
| Edition | Release date | Latest amendment | Standard | Description |
|---|---|---|---|---|
| First edition | 2004 | | ISO/IEC 14496-12:2004, ISO/IEC 15444-12:2004 | |
| Second edition | 2005 | 2008 | ISO/IEC 14496-12:2005, ISO/IEC 15444-12:2005 | |
| Third edition | 2008 | 2009 | ISO/IEC 14496-12:2008, ISO/IEC 15444-12:2008 | |
| Fourth edition | 2012 | 2015 | ISO/IEC 14496-12:2012, ISO/IEC 15444-12:2012 | |
| Fifth edition | 2015 | 2018 | ISO/IEC 14496-12:2015, ISO/IEC 15444-12:2015 | |
| Sixth edition | 2020 | | ISO/IEC 14496-12:2020 | |
| Seventh edition | 2022 | | ISO/IEC 14496-12:2022 | |
| Eighth edition | 2026 | | ISO/IEC 14496-12:2026 | |

== Extensions ==
Relations between the ISO base media file format, MP4 file format, 3GPP file format and 3GPP2 file format. Based on the 3GPP2 technical specification published on 18 May 2007.

The ISO base media file format is designed as an extensible file format. A list of all registered extensions for the ISO base media file format is published on the official registration authority website, www.mp4ra.org. The registration authority for code-points (identifier values) in "MP4 Family" files is Apple Inc., and it is named in Annex D (informative) in MPEG-4 Part 12. Codec designers should register the codes they invent, but the registration is not mandatory and some of the invented and used code-points are not registered. When someone is creating a new specification derived from the ISO base media file format, all the existing specifications should be used both as examples and a source of definitions and technology. If an existing specification already covers how a particular media type is stored in the file format (e.g., MPEG-4 audio or video in MP4), that definition should be used and a new one should not be invented.

MPEG has standardized a number of specifications extending the ISO base media file format: The MP4 file format (ISO/IEC 14496-14) defined some extensions over the ISO base media file format to support MPEG-4 visual/audio codecs and various MPEG-4 Systems features such as object descriptors and scene descriptions. The MPEG-4 Part 3 (MPEG-4 Audio) standard also defined storage of some audio compression formats. Storage of MPEG-1/2 Audio (MP3, MP2, MP1) in the ISO base media file format was defined in ISO/IEC 14496-3:2001/Amd 3:2005. The Advanced Video Coding (AVC) file format (ISO/IEC 14496-15) defined support for H.264/MPEG-4 AVC video compression. The High Efficiency Image File Format (HEIF) is an image container format using the ISO base media file format as the basis. While HEIF can be used with any image compression format, it specifically includes support for HEVC intra-coded images and HEVC-coded image sequences, taking advantage of inter-picture prediction.

Some of the above-mentioned MPEG standard extensions are used by other formats based on ISO base media file format (e.g., 3GP). The 3GPP file format (.3gp) specification also defined extensions to support H.263 video, AMR-NB, AMR-WB, AMR-WB+ audio, and 3GPP Timed Text in files based on the ISO base media file format. The 3GPP2 file format (.3g2) defined extensions for usage of EVRC, SMV, or 13K (QCELP) voice compression formats. The JPEG 2000 specification (ISO/IEC 15444-3) defined usage of Motion JPEG 2000 video compression and uncompressed audio (PCM) in the ISO base media file format (.mj2). The "DVB File Format" (.dvb) defined by the DVB Project allowed storage of DVB services in the ISO base media file format. It allows the storage of audio, video, and other content in any of three main ways: encapsulated in a MPEG transport stream, stored as a reception hint track; encapsulated in an RTP stream, stored as a reception hint track or stored directly as media tracks. The MPEG-21 File Format (.m21, .mp21) defined the storage of an MPEG-21 Digital Item in the ISO base media file format, with some or all of its ancillary data (such as movies, images, or other non-XML data) within the same file. The OMA DRM Content Format (.dcf) specification from Open Mobile Alliance defined the content format for DRM protected encrypted media objects and associated metadata. There are also other extensions, such as ISMA ISMACryp specification for encrypted/protected audio and video, G.719 audio compression specification, AC3 and E-AC-3 audio compression, DTS audio compression, Dirac video compression, VC-1 video compression specification and others, which are named on the MP4 Registration authority's website.

There are some extensions of the ISO base media file format that were not registered by the MP4 Registration authority. Adobe Systems introduced the F4V file format for Flash Video in 2007 and said it is based on the ISO base media file format. The F4V file format was not registered by the MP4 registration authority, but the F4V technical specification is publicly available. This format can contain H.264 video compression and MP3 or AAC audio compression. In addition, the F4V file format can contain data corresponding to the ActionScript Message Format and still frame of video data using image formats GIF, JPEG and PNG. Microsoft Corporation announced a file format based on the ISO base media file format in 2009 called ISMV (Smooth Streaming format), also known as Protected Interoperable File Format (PIFF). As announced, this format can, for example, contain VC-1, WMA, H.264, and AAC compression formats. Microsoft published a Protected Interoperable File Format (PIFF) specification in 2010. It defined another usage of multiple encryption and DRM systems in a single file container. The PIFF brand was registered by the MP4 registration authority in 2010. Some extensions used by this format (e.g., for WMA support) were not registered. Usage of the WMA compression format in the ISO base media file format was not publicly documented.

== Technical details ==
The ISO base media file format includes timing, structure, and media information for timed sequences of media data, such as audio-visual presentations. The file structure is object-oriented. A file can be decomposed into basic objects very simply, and the structure of the objects is implied from their type.

Files conforming to the ISO base media file format are formed as a series of objects, called "boxes". All data is contained in boxes, and there is no other data within the file. This includes any initial signature required by the specific file format. The "box" is an object-oriented building block defined by a unique type identifier and length. It was called an "atom" in some specifications (e.g., the first definition of the MP4 file format).

A presentation (motion sequence) may be contained in several files. All timing and framing (position and size) information must be in the ISO base media file, and the ancillary files may essentially use any format.

=== File type box ===
In order to identify the specifications to which a file based on the ISO base media file format complies, "brands" are used as identifiers in the file format. These are set in a box named file type box ("ftyp"), which must be placed in the beginning of the file. It is somewhat analogous to the so-called fourcc code, used for a similar purpose for media embedded in AVI container format. A brand might indicate the type of encoding used, how the data of each encoding is stored, constraints and extensions that are applied to the file, the compatibility, or the intended usage of the file. Brands are printable four-character codes. A file type box contains two kinds of brands. One is "major_brand", which identifies the specification of the best use for the file. It is followed by "minor_version", an informative 4-byte integer for the minor version of the major brand. The second kind of brand is "compatible_brands", which identifies multiple specifications to which the file complies. All files shall contain a file type box, but for compatibility reasons with an earlier version of the specification, files may be conformant to ISO/IEC base media file format and not contain a file type box. In that case, they should be read as if they contained an ftyp with a major and compatible brand "mp41" (MP4 v1 – ISO 14496-1, Chapter 13). Some in-use brands (ftyps) are not registered and can be found on some webpages.

A multimedia file structured upon ISO/IEC base media file format may be compatible with more than one concrete specification, and it is therefore not always possible to speak of a single "type" or "brand" for the file. In this regard, the utility of the MIME type and file name extension is somewhat reduced. In spite of that, when a derived specification is written, a new file extension will be used, a new MIME type, and a new Macintosh file type.

=== Streaming ===
The ISO/IEC base media file format supports streaming of media data over a network as well as local playback. A file that supports streaming includes information about the data units to stream (how to serve the elementary stream data in the file over streaming protocols). This information is placed in additional tracks of the file called "hint" tracks. Separate "hint" tracks for different protocols may be included within the same file. The media will play over all such protocols without making any additional copies or versions of the media data. Existing media can be easily made streamable for other specific protocols by the addition of appropriate hint tracks. The media data itself need not be reformatted in any way. The streams sent by the servers under the direction of the hint tracks, need to contain no trace of file-specific information. When the presentation is played back locally (not streamed), the hint tracks may be ignored. Hint tracks may be created by an authoring tool or may be added to an existing file (presentation) by a hinting tool. In media authored for progressive download, the moov box, which contains the index of frames, should precede the movie data mdat box.
