= QCP (file format) =

QCP File Format
- Filename extension: .qcp
- Internet media type: audio/qcelp
- Magic number: RIFF ... QLCM
- Developed by: Qualcomm
- Initial release: August 1999
- Type of format: audio file format
- Container for: QCELP 13K, Enhanced Variable Rate Coder (EVRC), and Selectable Mode Vocoder (SMV)
- Extended from: RIFF
- Standard: MIME Type Registration of RTP Payload Formats
- Open format?: ?
- Website: tools.ietf.org/html/rfc3625

The QCP file format is used by many cellular telephone manufacturers to provide ring tones and record voice. It is based on RIFF, a generic format for storing chunks of data identified by tags. The QCP format does not specify how voice data in the file is encoded. Rather, it is a container format. QCP files are typically encoded QCELP or EVRC.

Qualcomm, which originated the format, has removed an internal web page link from the page that formerly discussed QCP. "Out of an abundance of caution, due to the December 31st, 2007 injunction ordered against certain Qualcomm products, Qualcomm has temporarily removed certain web content until it can be reviewed and modified if necessary to ensure compliance with the injunction. It may be several more days or weeks before these pages are accessible again. Thank you for your patience."

QCP files have the same signature as RIFF files: A SOF (start of file) header of 52494646 ("RIFF"), and an EOF (end of file) of 0000.

== Playing QCP files ==
Qualcomm previously offered downloads of the software and SDK for its PureVoice voice and audio enhancement products that could play and convert QCP files.
