= ASUS GPU Tweak =

GPU overclocking and monitoring software

- Developer: ASUS Tek
- Stable release: v1.9.5.8 / May 20, 2025
- Operating system: Microsoft Windows
- Type: Windows Registry Tweaking
- License: Freeware
- Website: ASUS GPU Tweak III Home page

ASUS GPU Tweak is an overclocking and monitoring utility software for GPUs, developed by ASUS. ASUS GPU Teak is designed to help get the most out of ASUS graphic card. The initial version of ASUS GPU Tweak, which was released in 2012, was based on RivaTuner.

It allows for greater customization of GPU settings, including adjusting clock speeds, voltages, and fan speeds. The software is especially useful for gamers and PC enthusiasts to maximize the performance of their ASUS graphics cards or ensure stability for demanding tasks.

== See also ==
- MSI Afterburner
- Tweaking
