= Alexander Anisimov (chemist) =

Russian petrochemist

Alexander Vladimirovich Anisimov
- Born: July 20, 1945 (age 81); Kaunas, Lithuanian SSR, USSR
- Citizenship: USSR → Russia
- Education: Faculty of Chemistry, MSU Doctor of Chemical Sciences (1985) Professor (1990)
- Scientific career
- Fields: Organic chemistry, petrochemistry
- Workplaces: Faculty of Chemistry, MSU

Alexander Vladimirovich Anisimov (born July 20, 1945, in Kaunas, Lithuania) is a Russian chemist specializing in organic chemistry and catalysis. He holds a Doctor of Chemical Sciences degree (1985) and has been a professor in the field of petrochemistry since 1990. In 2014, he was awarded the title of Distinguished Professor of Moscow University. He is Head of the Laboratory of Heteroatom Compounds and Deputy Head of the Department of Petroleum Chemistry and Organic Catalysis at the Faculty of Chemistry of Lomonosov Moscow State University.

== Education ==
He was born on July 20, 1945, in Kaunas, Lithuania. At the age of one, he moved with his mother to Sverdlovsk (Yekaterinburg). In 1958, he moved with his family to the city of Lviv in the Ukrainian SSR. A year later, he moved to Drohobych, Lviv Oblast, where he graduated from secondary school in 1963. His desire to pursue a career in chemistry was significantly influenced by his teacher, Ksenia Nikitichna Ilyinskaya, an Honored Teacher of the Ukrainian SSR.

In 1963, he enrolled in the Faculty of Chemistry at MSU, graduating in 1968 with a specialist degree from the Department of Petroleum Chemistry.

In 1971, he defended his Candidate of Sciences dissertation entitled "Transformations of alkyl-2,3-dihydrobenzofurans and alkyl octahydrobenzofurans under heterogeneous acid catalysis". Following his postgraduate studies, he turned his attention to the chemistry of organosulfur compounds.

== Career ==
In 1985, he defended his doctoral dissertation entitled "Molecular Rearrangements of Alkenyl Hetarylsulfides and Ethers, and Transformations of Fused Thiophene and Furan Derivatives".

Since July 1, 1988, he has headed the Laboratory of Heteroatom Compounds at the Faculty of Chemistry.

From 1997 to 2012, he served as Deputy Dean for Research at the Faculty of Chemistry of MSU.

From 2002 to 2011, he was a member of the Expert Council on Organic Chemistry of the Higher Attestation Commission (HAC).

Since 2010, he has been a corresponding member of the Russian Academy of Natural Sciences (RANS).

In 2018, he served as Deputy Chair of the Programme Committee of the 18th IUPAC International Symposium on Macromolecular Metal Complexes.

== Research ==
As a result of his research, the group led by A. V. Anisimov succeeded in establishing the mechanisms underlying the transformations of allyl sulfides, as illustrated by the rearrangements of a number of thiophenes.. The group also developed methods for the synthesis of cyclic sulfides, proposed methods for preparing functional derivatives of sulfides and disulfides through biphasic reactions, and developed new complexing agents based on thiacrown ethers

The group's second major research area focused on the development of oxidative desulfurization, an alternative method for purifying petroleum fractions, under both homogeneous and heterogeneous catalytic conditions.

A. V. Anisimov's research group collaborates with Russian oil companies. In particular, a project was carried out for PJSC Gazprom Neft involving the use of ammonia waste to remove mercaptans from catalytic cracking gasoline. Oxidative desulfurization technologies have been implemented at facilities associated with PJSC Gazprom Neft and PJSC Tatneft.

He is a member of the editorial boards of the journals "Химия и бизнес", "Химическая технология", and "Вестн. Моск. ун-та Сер. Химия".
