= LG Neon (GT365) =

Cellular phone model

The LG Neon (Model GT365) is a cellular phone capable of text messaging. Manufactured by LG Corp., it features a semi-touchscreen and a full QWERTY slide out keyboard.

== Features ==
The LG Neon is an entry-level messaging phone. It lacks many features, such as 3G and Wi-Fi. However, it is EDGE capable and has its own web browser as well as a messenger and mail application capable of connecting to Yahoo and Hotmail accounts. The LG Neon has a 2-megapixel camera, a full QWERTY slide-out keyboard, and Bluetooth that can be used to transfer files between other devices. The model was dubbed the Neon by AT&T. It is available in a variety of colors such as blue, black, white and pink.

The Neon features a microSD card slot that can support up to 4 GB of memory. It is a GSM phone and supports various formats of music including MP3, AAC, and WAV. The only video format it plays is 3GP. The camera produces JPG images as well as videos which are recorded as QVGA at 320x240 resolution maximum. It supports Java, allowing the user to transfer JAR and JAD files to the phone and install them.

A setback to the LG Neon is that it may turn off or occasionally stop activity when sliding the keyboard open or closed.
