= LPEC =

LPEC can stand for:

- Linear Predictive Echo Cancelling
- Linn Protocol for Eventing and Control
- Long-term Predicted Excitation Coding, a Sony codec optimised for voice recording
- LCV Platform Engineering Corporation, a joint venture between Isuzu and General Motors
- Lost Planet: Extreme Condition, a third-person shooter video game
- LP Executive Consulting, LLC, a US-based loss prevention and security consulting company
