= W200 =

W200 may refer to:

- Sony Cyber-shot DSC-W200, a point-and-shoot digital camera released in 2007
- Sony Ericsson W200, a cellphone released in 2007
