= Sony Ericsson W200 =

Cell phone model

Sony Ericsson W200i
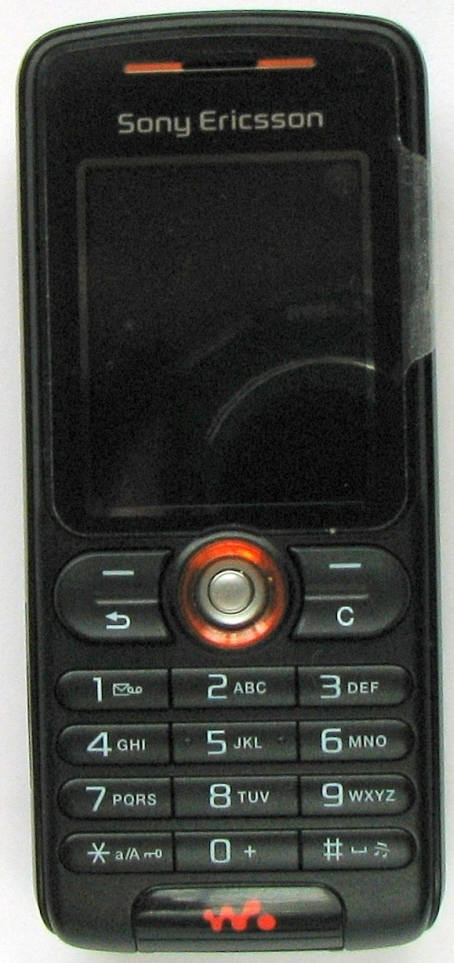
- Compatible networks: GSM 900, GSM 1800, GSM 1900
- Dimensions: 101 mm × 44 mm × 18 mm (3.98 in × 1.73 in × 0.71 in)
- Weight: 85 g (3.0 oz)
- Memory: 27 MB of internal memory
- Rear camera: VGA 4x Digital Zoom Camera
- Display: 128x160 pixels, 65,000 Color 1.8″ TFT LCD screen
- Connectivity: IrDA, USB

The Sony Ericsson W200 Walkman is a cellphone measuring 101 × 44 × 18mm (3.9 × 1.7 × 0.7 inches) and weighs 85g (3 oz). It features a VGA camera, an FM radio, and Sony's Walkman software, although it lacks Bluetooth.

The screen resolution is 128×160 pixels, screen size is 1.8″, and the internal memory is an average 27MB but this may be expanded using a Memory Stick Micro (M2).

The phone is Triband so it can use the GSM 900, 1800 & 1900 networks.

The W200 is available in four colors, Rhythm Black, Pulse White, Grey and Aquatic White. UK mobile firm Orange released it in a Passion Pink. This mobile is an upgrade to the popular K310 camera phone. It has a VGA camera that features 4× digital zoom and can take pictures up to a resolution of 640x480 pixels hardware or 1280x960 pixels with software interpolation. It can also record video (3GP with AMR Audio) up to 176x144 pixels.

The included Memory Stick Micro is big enough to store 30+ songs and can be replaced with a card up to 2GB (8GB supported if the M2 is formatted with FAT32). It also has an FM radio with support for RDS.

The W200 interface and OS is closely similar to its predecessor Sony Ericsson W300i which has been one of the best selling Sony Ericsson phones. (see List of best-selling mobile phones)

== Features ==
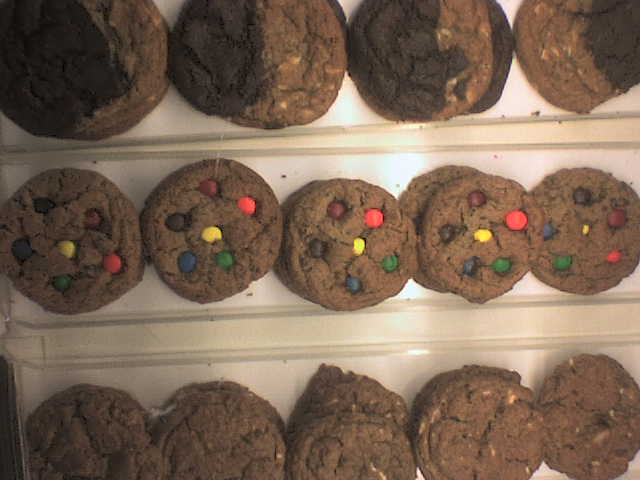
Picture taken with a Sony Ericsson W200a

Music

- Walkman player 1.0
- Supports MP3, AAC, mp4 and 3gp
- 256MB Memory Stick Micro M2 included (size varies)
- Disc2Phone music management software
- Stereo headphones in the box (HPM-64)
- FM radio with RDS

Messaging

- CSTN screenpin
- SMS, MMS, e-mail.

Connectivity

- NetFront web browser
- Infrared port
- USB 2.0
- GPRS

Misc

- Java 6.7
- 27MB Onboard flash memory (Depends on operator pre-customizations)
- FOTA

Supported networks

- GSM 900, 1800, 1900

== Release ==
Sony Ericsson W200 was announced in the second quarter of 2007. It was released in three variants: W200a (for the Americas), W200c (for China) and W200i (rest of the world). All the three variants had minor differences, like the languages available in the phone. Sony Ericsson launched W200i as the budget Walkman phone. It retailed at about USD 150 at its launch in the US. In the UK it was initially available for 200 pounds and subsequently its price dropped to a 100 pounds.

== Reception ==
W200 is mainly aimed for the youth who are looking for a reasonable yet a good quality music phone. W200 provides all the major music player features at almost half the price of any other phone in its category. This attribute was well appreciated by reviewers at different websites and magazines. CNET.uk said in its review: "The music features are one of the most impressive aspects of the handset." Many reviewers criticized the lack of Bluetooth, since it was a music phone, but acknowledged the high quality music output and the value for money. With such features, Sony Ericsson W200 has gone on to become one of the best selling Walkman phones.

== See also ==
- Sony Ericsson W300i
