= Project DReaM =

Project DReaM was a Sun Microsystems project aimed at developing an open interoperable DRM architecture that implements standardized interfaces. Its primary goal was the creation of a royalty-free digital rights management industry standard. On 22 August 2005, Sun announced that it was opening up Project DReaM, which had started as an internal research project, as part of their Open Media Commons initiative. It was released under the Common Development and Distribution License (CDDL). Due to inactivity on the project, it was closed and archived in August 2008. DReaM is an acronym that stands for "DRM everywhere/available".

Project DReaM included of a Java Stream Assembly API to support digital video management and distribution, a hardware- and operating system-independent interoperable DRM standard called DRM-OPERA, and the Sun Streaming Server to stream video and audio over IP. The key characteristics of Project DReaM were as follows:

- Network identity focus: Project DReaM approaches DRM (and CAS) from a network identity management-focused perspective, rather than a device-centric approach.
- Interoperability: Project DReaM uses an open approach and fully specifies everything necessary to build heterogeneous, interoperable, vendor neutral implementations.
- No reliance on security through obscurity: Project DReaM's architecture does not follow the traditional model of security through obscurity which must maintain a closed source code base in order to operate securely.
- Royalty-free design model: Project DReaM is designed to be royalty free, allowing developers to avoid encumbered technology that carries onerous licensing costs.

Project DReaM technology required the software code to be signed and run on trusted computing hardware, on which unauthorized or unsigned code cannot be run. This approach was criticized by journalist Cory Doctorow, who characterized Project DReaM as crippleware. Project DReaM was favorably mentioned by Mike Linksvayer in a 2008 article discussing its support for fair use and Creative Commons-licensed content.

== See also ==
- Open Media Commons
