= LibriVox =

Public domain audiobook project

- Location: Worldwide (U.S. based)
- Established: August 2005

Collection
- Size: 20,000 (17 December 2024)

Access and use
- Members: Worldwide volunteers

Other information
- Budget: US$5,000 per annum (as of 2010)
- Director: N/A (community-shared)
- Website: librivox.org

Sample
The first chapter of A Study in Scarlet, the first novel about Sherlock Holmes, by Arthur Conan Doyle read by LibriVox volunteer David Clarke.

LibriVox is a project of a group of worldwide volunteers who read and record public domain texts, creating free public domain audiobooks for download from their website and other digital library hosting sites on the internet. It was founded in 2005 by Hugh McGuire with the objective to "make all books in the public domain available, for free, in audio format on the internet."

On 6 August 2016, the completed projects numbered 10,000; on 14 February 2021 there were 15,000, and on 17 December 2024 the catalog reached 20,000 recordings. Most releases are in the English language, but many non-English works are also available. There are multiple affiliated projects that are providing additional content. LibriVox is associated with Project Gutenberg from where the project gets some of its texts, and the Internet Archive that hosts digital recordings.

== History ==
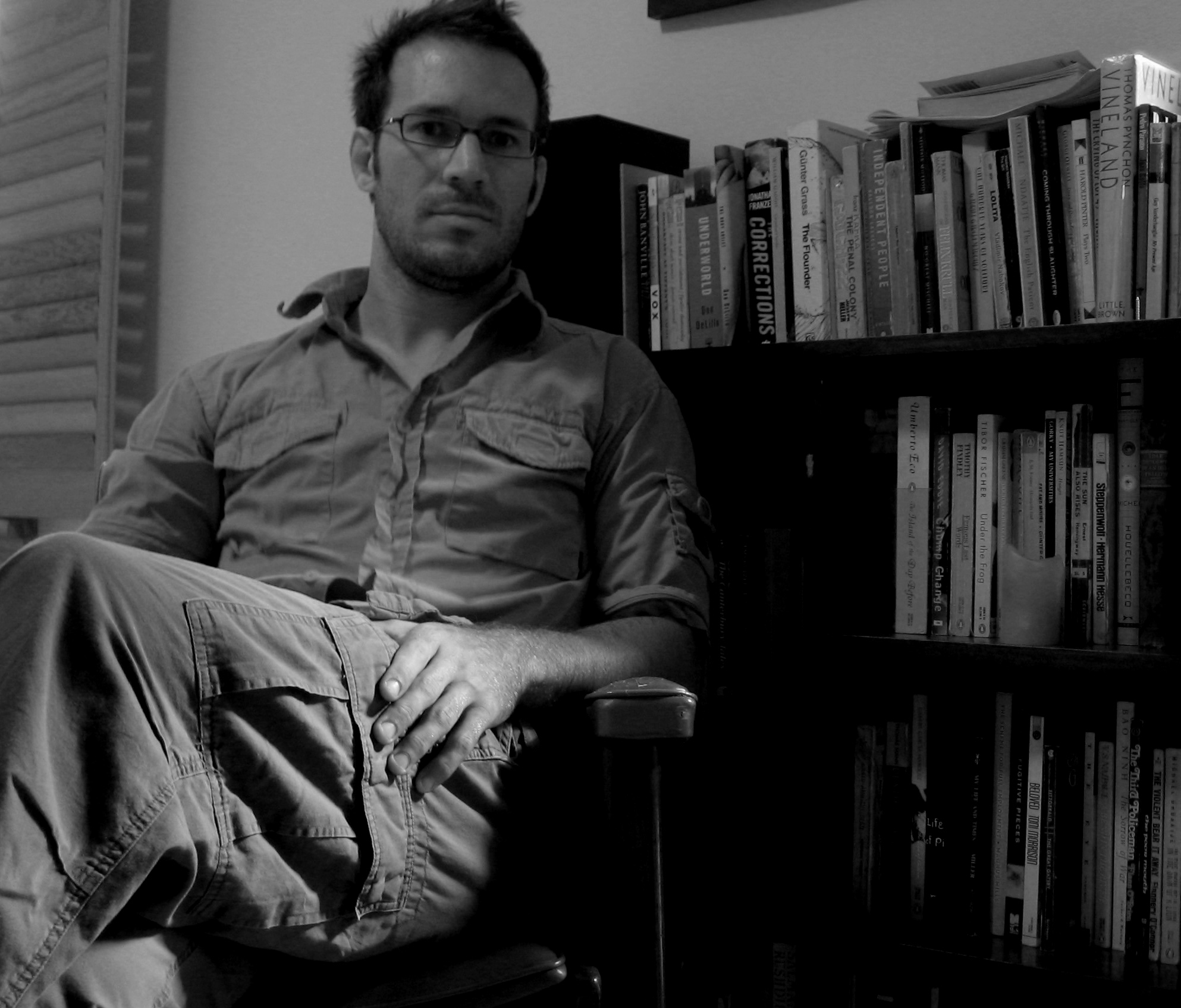
Hugh McGuire, founder of LibriVox

Can the net harness a bunch of volunteers to help bring books in the public domain to life through podcasting?

— Hugh McGuire

LibriVox was started in August 2005 by Montreal-based writer Hugh McGuire, who set up a blog, and posed the question. The first recorded book was The Secret Agent by Joseph Conrad.

== Etymology of LibriVox ==
LibriVox is an invented word inspired by Latin words liber (book) in its genitive form libri and vox (voice), giving the meaning BookVoice (or voice of the book). The word was also coined because of other connotations: liber also means child and free, independent, unrestricted. As the LibriVox forum says: "We like to think LibriVox might be interpreted as 'child of the voice', and 'free voice'. Finally, the other link we like is 'library' so you could imagine it to mean Library of Voice".

There has been no decision or consensus by LibriVox founders or the community of volunteers for a single pronunciation of LibriVox. It is accepted that any pronunciation is accurate.

== Organization and funding ==
LibriVox is a volunteer-run, free content, public domain project. It has no budget or legal personality. The development of projects is managed through an Internet forum, supported by an admin team, who also maintain a searchable catalogue database of completed works.

In early 2010, LibriVox ran a fundraising drive to raise $20,000 to cover hosting costs for the website of about $5,000/year and improve front- and backend usability. The target was reached in 13 days, and so the fundraising ended and LibriVox suggested that supporters consider making donations to its affiliates and partners, Project Gutenberg and the Internet Archive.

== Production process ==
Volunteers can choose new projects to start, either recording on their own or inviting others to join them, or they can contribute to projects that have been started by others. Once a volunteer has recorded their contribution, it is uploaded to the site, and proof-listened by members of the LibriVox community.

Finished audiobooks are available from the LibriVox website, and MP3 files are hosted separately by the Internet Archive. Recordings are also available through other means, such as YouTube and iTunes, and, being free of copyright, they are frequently distributed independently of LibriVox on the Internet and otherwise.

== Content ==
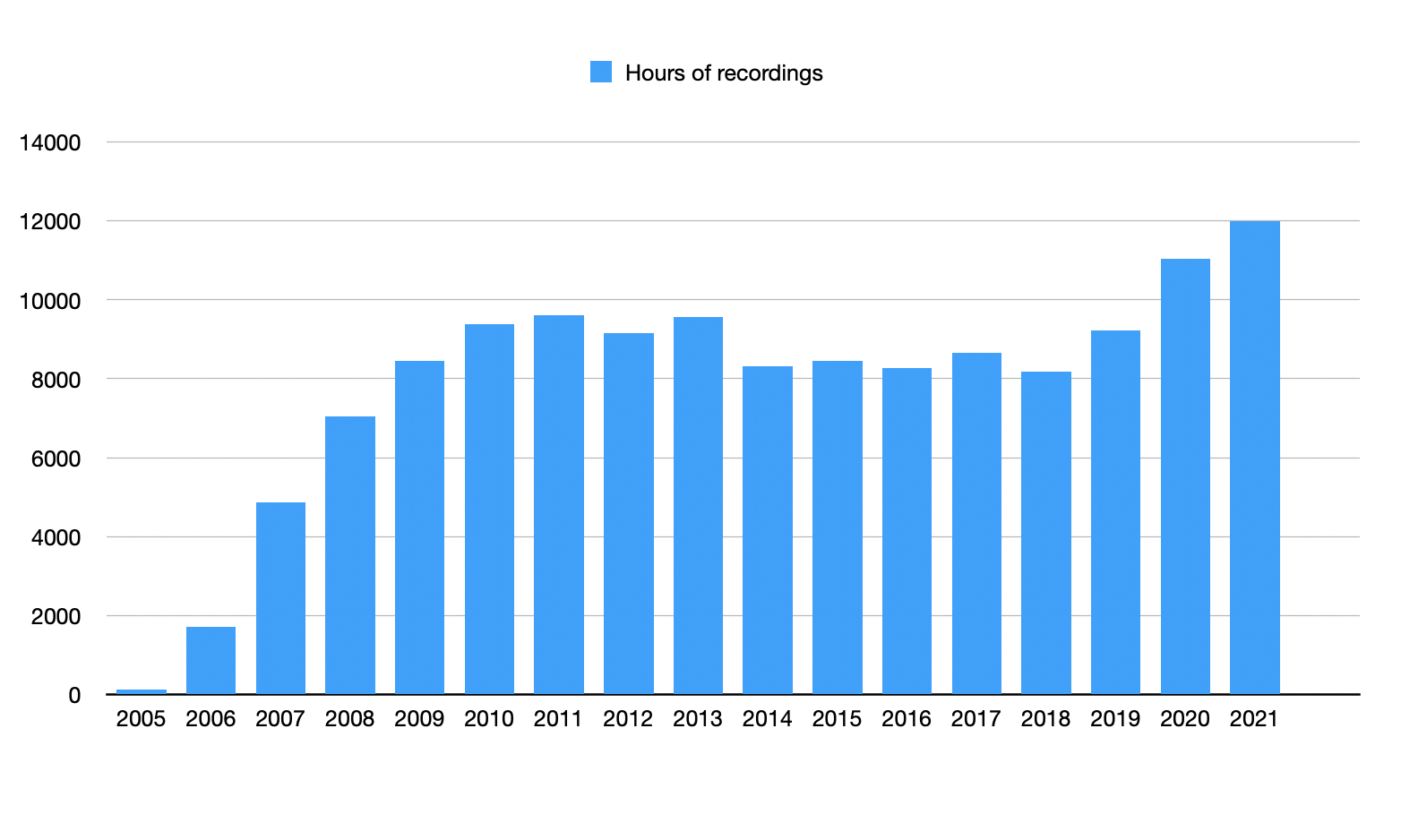
LibriVox recorded hours by year 2005–2021

LibriVox only records material that is in the public domain in the United States, and all LibriVox books are released with a public domain dedication. Because of copyright restrictions, LibriVox produces recordings of only a limited number of contemporary books. These have included, for example, the 9/11 Commission Report, which as a work of the US Federal Government is in the public domain.

The LibriVox catalogue is varied. It contains popular and classic fiction, but it also includes difficult texts such as Immanuel Kant's Critique of Pure Reason, and a recording of the first 500 digits of pi. The collection also features poetry, plays, religious texts (for example, English versions of the Koran and books from various translations of the Bible) and non-fiction of various interests. In January 2009, the catalogue contained approximately 55 percent fiction and drama, 25 percent non-fiction and 20 percent poetry (calculated by numbers of recordings). By the end of 2023, the most viewed item (22.7M) was a reading of The Art of War attributed to Sun Tzu and read in 2006 by Moira Fogarty, followed by a 2006 collective reading of Alice's Adventures in Wonderland with 22.4M views.

Around 90 percent of the catalogue is recorded in English, but recordings exist in more than 90 languages (as of 2019).

== Reputation ==
LibriVox has garnered significant interest, in particular from those interested in the promotion of volunteer-led content and alternative approaches to copyright ownership on the Internet.

It has received support from the Internet Archive and Project Gutenberg. Intellectual freedom and commons proponent Mike Linksvayer described it in 2008 as "perhaps the most interesting collaborative culture project this side of Wikipedia".

The project has also been featured in press around the world and has been recommended by the BBC's Click, MSNBC's The Today Show, Reason, Wired, the US PC Magazine and the UK Metro and Sunday Times newspapers.

== Quality ==
A frequent concern of listeners is the site's policy of allowing any recording to be published as long as it is understandable and faithful to the source text. This means that some recordings are of lower audio fidelity; some feature background noises, non-native accents or other perceived imperfections in comparison to professionally recorded audiobooks. While some listeners may object to those books with chapters read by multiple readers, others find this to be a non-issue or even a feature, though many books are narrated by a single reader.

The narrations have been called outsider art. John Adamian, writing in Wired, noted:

Sometimes while listening I feel like I'm eavesdropping on a strange over-wrought audition, where an aspiring actor tries on and abandons accents, tweaks their voice in pitch too much, or hyperextends vowels in an effort to feel their way into the voice of a fictional New England sea captain, or a crude Yorkshire industrialist, or a displaced German Jew in London. Some readings are wooden, but with a kind of affectlessness that starts to seem like its own interesting artistic choice once you've settled into the performance.

== See also ==
- Virtual volunteering
- Voice acting
