= G.719 =

ITU-T standard audio coding format

G.719 is an ITU-T standard audio coding format providing high quality, moderate bit rate (32 to 128 kbit/s) wideband (20 Hz - 20 kHz audio bandwidth, 48 kHz audio sample rate) audio coding at low computational load. It was produced through a collaboration between Polycom and Ericsson.

G.719 is based on modified discrete cosine transform (MDCT) coding. It incorporates elements of Polycom's Siren22 codec (22 kHz) and Ericsson codec technology, as well as Polycom's Siren7 and Siren14 codecs (G.722.1 and G.722.1 Annex C), which have been used in videoconferencing systems for many years. As ITU-T Recommendation G.719, it was approved on June 13, 2008.

G.719 is optimized for both speech and music. It is based on transform coding with adaptive time-resolution, adaptive bit-allocation and low complexity lattice vector quantization. The computational complexity is quite low (18 floating-point MIPS) for an efficient high-quality compressor. The codec operates on 20 ms frames, and the algorithmic delay end-to-end is 40 ms. The encoder input and decoder output are sampled at 48 kHz.

In addition to the nominal bit rates of 32, 48 and 64 kbit/s, the G.719 codec has an inherent feature of flexible rate selection. In fact, it is possible to accommodate any rate between 32 kbit/s and 64 kbit/s by steps of 4 kbit/s. Moreover, the codec can also provide higher rates than 64 kbit/s and up to 128 kbit/s.

Amendment 1 of the ITU-T G.719 specification defined the use of the ISO base media file format (ISO/IEC 14496-12 a.k.a. MPEG-4 Part 12) as container for the G.719 bitstream. It also defined stereo and multichannel use of G.719 bitstreams in the ISO base media file format. It addresses non-conversational use cases of the codec (e.g. call waiting music playback and recording of teleconferencing sessions, voice mail messages). Thus, media file formats such as MP4 (audio/mp4 or video/mp4) and 3GP (audio/3GPP and video/3GPP) can contain G.719-encoded audio.

RFC 5404 defined media type audio/G719.

== Licensing ==
G.719 is licensed by Polycom, Inc. and by Ericsson; both licenses are necessary for use. Polycom licensees also receive the right to use G.722.1 (Siren7, Polycom's 7 kHz codec), and G.722.1 Annex C (Siren14, the 14 kHz equivalent).

== See also ==
- Comparison of audio formats
- List of codecs
