= MSI Afterburner =

Graphics card monitoring utility

- Original author: Alexey Nicolaychuk
- Developer: MSI
- Release: October 2009
- Stable release: 4.6.6 (final) / October 2025; 1 year ago
- Preview release: 4.6.7 Beta 3 / 24 June 2026; 4 months ago
- Operating system: Microsoft Windows
- Type: Overclocking
- License: Freeware
- Website: msi.com/Landing/afterburner/graphics-cards www.guru3d.com/download/msi-afterburner-beta-download/

MSI Afterburner is an overclocking and monitoring utility software for graphics cards, provided by MSI. Developed in Russia by Alexey Nicolaychuk (Guru3D.com – official distribution and development), who also developed RivaTuner, the core software behind MSI AfterBurner. The software is widely used for enhancing the performance of graphics cards, especially in gaming and high-performance tasks. Afterburner can overclock the GPU and video memory, monitor hardware temperatures and clock speeds, perform benchmarks, and display an on-screen display to show frames per second, temperatures, GPU and CPU usage, etc. MSI Afterburner is compatible with Nvidia, AMD and Intel GPUs, including iGPUs.

MSI Afterburner first released in October 2009, for Windows XP and later. Following Russia's invasion of Ukraine in 2022, sanctions prevented MSI from paying Nicolaychuk, leading to a pause in the software's development until 2023.

== Download ==
One of two official locations you may download MSI Afterburner from, others are ill-advised as several spoof websites have re-distributed this software with a changed installer. You should download solely from:

- Guru3D.com (developer) – download
- MSI (license holder) – download

== Features ==
One of the primary features of MSI Afterburner is its ability to overclock graphics cards. Overclocking can boost the performance of a graphics card by increasing the clock speeds and adjusting memory settings resulting in smoother frame rates and better performance in demanding games and applications, however if pushed too high, the overclock can damage the graphics card and may result in the warranty being voided. Afterburner provides sliders to tweak the core clock, memory clock, and voltage. By increasing the voltage, users can achieve more stability at higher frequencies, which is essential for running demanding games or tasks without crashes or instability. However, voltage increases should be done cautiously to avoid damaging the GPU or causing excessive heat. It gives users full control over the GPU's fan speed. Users can create custom fan curves based on temperature thresholds, ensuring either higher temperature of the graphics card but quieter operation and vice-versa.

== Reception ==
In 2019, PC World praised Afterburner for its customizability and built-in video capture tool while criticizing its usability and negative performance impact on lower-end systems.

== See also ==
- Tweaking
