= Lagarith =

Open source lossless video codec

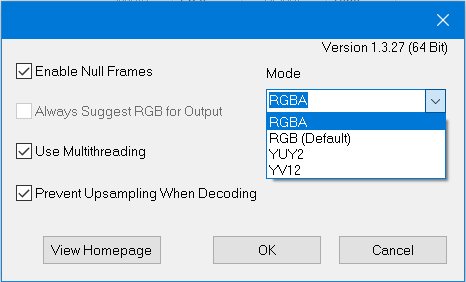
- Lagarith 1327 configuration dialog running on Windows 10.
- Developer: Ben Greenwood
- Initial release: October 4, 2004; 21 years ago
- Stable release: 1.3.27 / 8 December 2011; 14 years ago
- Written in: C++, ASM
- Operating system: Windows 2000 and later
- Predecessor: Huffyuv
- Type: lossless video codec
- License: GNU GPLv3
- Website: lags.leetcode.net/codec.html

Lagarith is an open source lossless video codec written by Ben Greenwood. It is a fork of the code of HuffYUV and offers better compression at the cost of greatly reduced speed on uniprocessor systems. Lagarith was designed and written with a few aims in mind:

Speed
While not as fast as HuffYUV, it still outperforms most other lossless video codecs when it comes to encoding times, although decoding speed may be slower. Recent versions also support parallelizing on multi-processor systems.
Color-space support
Color-space conversions can cause rounding errors, introducing data loss, contrary to the ideal of lossless video compression. Lagarith attempts to avoid this problem by supporting YV12, YUY2, RGB, and RGBA colorspaces.
Keyframes
Disallowing inter-prediction means that each frame can be separately decoded. This makes cutting, joining and seeking much easier.

These three things, as well as being more efficient at compression than HuffYUV, make it editing stage.

== See also ==
- List of lossless video codecs
