= MSU =

MSU may refer to:

== Science and technology ==
- Microwave sounding unit, in atmospheric science
- Mid-stream urine, used in medicine to test for urinary tract infection
- Million service units, particularly in IBM mainframe computers
- Mobile stroke unit, a specialised ambulance for patients suspected of having had a stroke
- MSU Lossless Video Codec, Moscow State University Lossless Video Codec
- Monosodium Urate (Cf. Gout)
- The .msu file, see Windows Update Standalone Installer

== Universities ==
=== India ===
- Maharaja Sayajirao University of Baroda
- Manonmaniam Sundaranar University

=== Russia ===
- Maritime State University
- Moscow State University

=== United States ===
- McNeese State University, in Lake Charles, Louisiana
- Memphis State University, former name of the University of Memphis
- Metropolitan State University, in Minneapolis and Saint Paul, Minnesota
- Metropolitan State University of Denver, in Colorado
- Michigan State University, in East Lansing, Michigan
- Midwestern State University, in Wichita Falls, Texas
- Minnesota State University, Mankato
- Minnesota State University Moorhead
- Minot State University, in Minot, North Dakota
- Mississippi State University
- Missouri State University
- University of Missouri (antiquated)
- Montana State University System
  - The flagship campus, Montana State University, in Bozeman, Montana
- Montclair State University, in Montclair, New Jersey
- Morehead State University, in Morehead, Kentucky
- Morgan State University, in Baltimore, Maryland
- Mountain State University, in Beckley, West Virginia
- Murray State University, in Murray, Kentucky

=== Other places ===
- Management and Science University, Malaysia
- Moldova State University, Moldova
- Mahendra Sanskrit University, Nepal
- Mindanao State University, Philippines
- Imam Muhammad ibn Saud Islamic University, Saudi Arabia
- Mahasarakham University, Thailand
- Mimar Sinan Fine Arts University, Turkey
- Midlands State University, Zimbabwe

== Other ==
- IATA code for Moshoeshoe I International Airport in Maseru, Lesotho
- ISO 639 code for the Musom language
- Studite Brethren (Monaci Studiti Ucraini), a religious society of the Ukrainian Greek Catholic Church
- McMaster Students Union, in Hamilton, Ontario, Canada
- Muslim Student Union, a variation of Muslim Students' Association
- Museum of Contemporary Art, Zagreb (Croatian: Muzej suvremene umjetnosti)
- Multinational Specialized Unit, a unit of the Italian Carabinieri
- Miyazaki Sportsmen United, the former name of Tegevajaro Miyazaki, a Japanese football club
- MSU Argentina, company based in Argentina, founded by Manuel Santos de Uribelarrea.
