= Sony Ericsson W300i =

Cell phone model

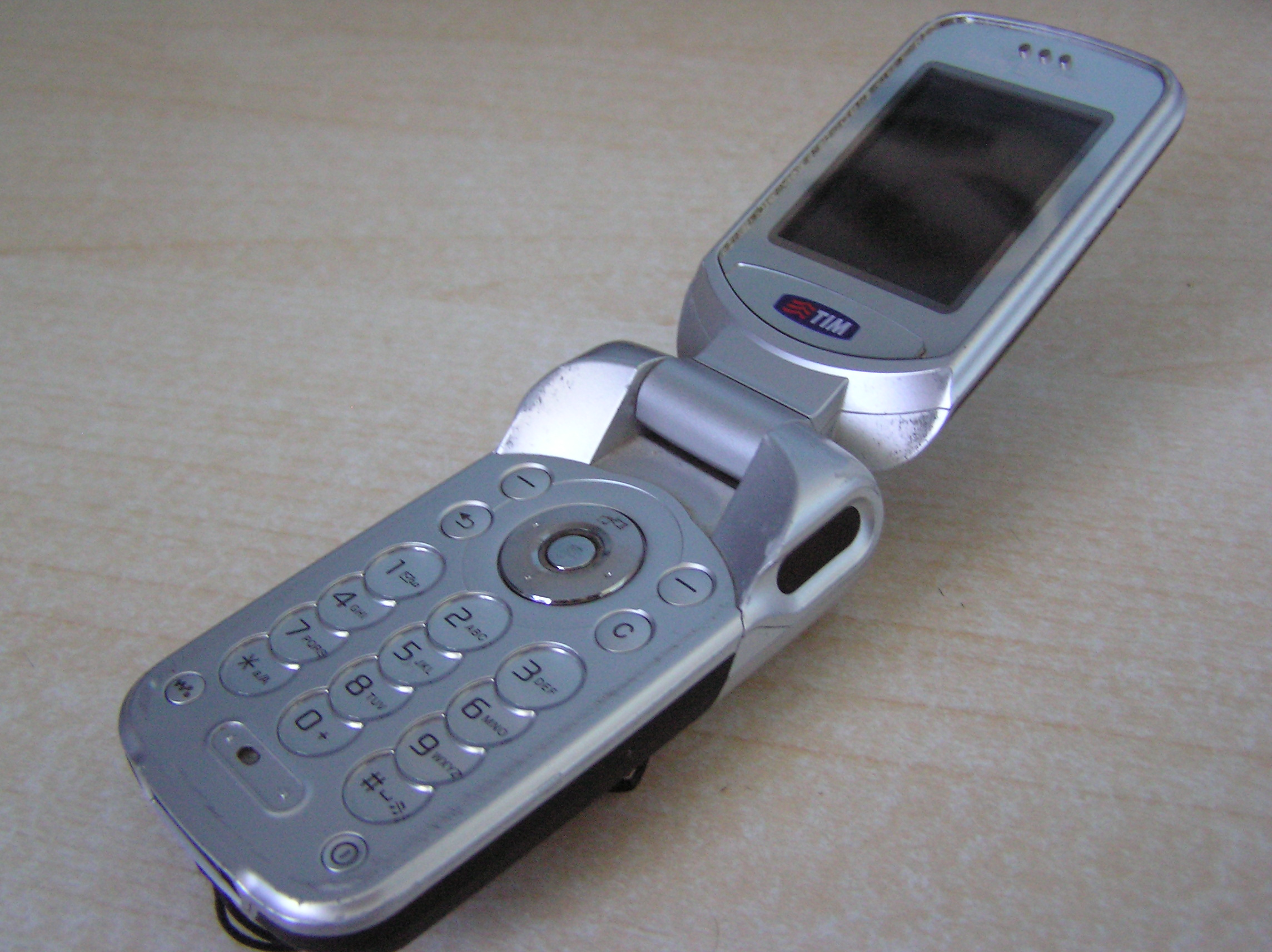
- Manufacturer: Sony Ericsson
- Compatible networks: EDGE, GPRS GSM 850/900/1800/1900
- Memory: 20 MB internal
- Removable storage: Memory Stick Micro
- Battery: Li-Po 900 mAh battery
- Data inputs: Keypad

The Sony Ericsson W300i, launched Q2 2006, is a clamshell phone from the W-series of Sony Ericsson.

This quad-band phone features an internal 20 MB storage, with a Memory Stick Micro slot for expansion, up to an additional 2 GB. Its dimensions are 90 mm × 47 mm × 24 mm with a weight of 94 g.

== Specifications ==
Feature	Specification
Display	1.8″ TFT LCD 262K-colour (128×160 pixels)
Internal memory	20 MB
Memory slot	Memory Stick Micro (M2) card (sizes up to 2 GB supported).
Size	90 × 47 × 24 mm
Weight	94 grams (3.32 oz)
Data	GSM (850/900/1800/1900), GPRS class 10 (4+1/3+2 slots), 32–48 kb/s, HSCSD, EDGE Class 10, 236.8 kbit/s, Bluetooth, Infrared, USB v2.0
Colors	Shadow Black, Shimmering White, Lime Green
Stand-by time	Up to 400 hours
Talk time	Up to 9 hours
Music playback	Up to 27 hours (continuous playback)
Compatible media formats	MP3, 3GP, AAC (LC and HE) in both MP4 and M4A containers, AMR, MIDI, IMY, EMY, WAV (up to 16 kHz sampling rate), 3GPP streams
Camera	VGA with ability to record 176×144 3GPP video or 640×480 still images
Display	128×160 pixels colour screen

== Walkman music player ==
The W300i also functions as a Walkman music player. The W300i can read both MP3 and MP4 tracks, and software which comes with the mobile phone (Disc2Phone) can convert other file types such as WMA, and although album artwork is not viewable, the W300i will read track details (via id3v1 tagging): artist, album, song name and sort them for easy access.

== Known issues ==
White Screen Of Death – According to many owners, the screen has a tendency to freeze and/or go white.

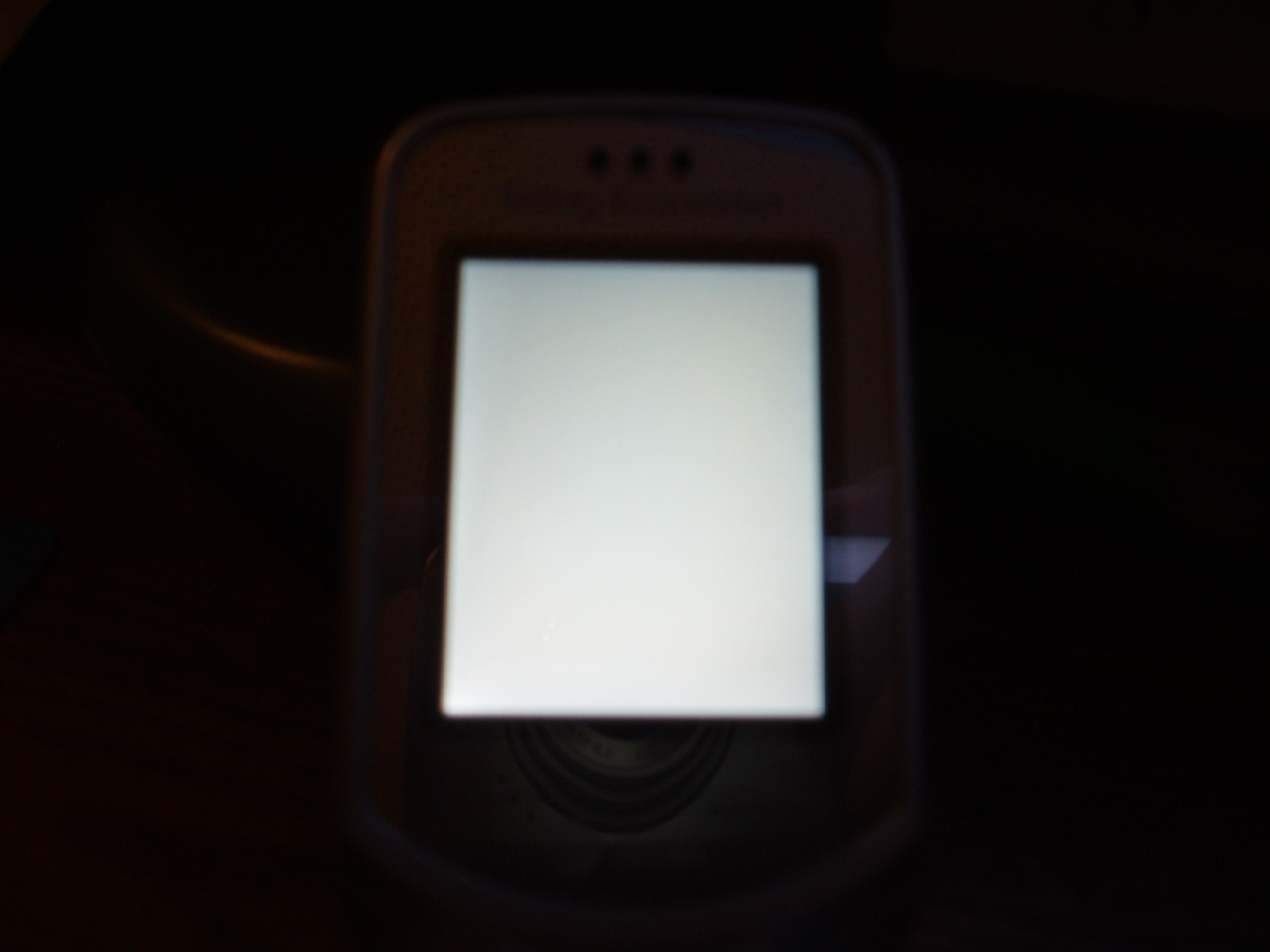
This is a Sony Ericsson W300i showing the white screen of death.

Flimsy parts – The top of the phone is also known to have some flex issues.

Battery cover – It has been stated in some official and unofficial reviews that the battery cover is very difficult to open. The User's Manual shows that you only have to push out the battery cover, yet this is very difficult to accomplish. An easy fix for this is to put an eraser on the cover and use it to slide the cover open. Furthermore, continued opening and closing of the battery cover causes it to lose its ability to stay on the phone, and instead needs to be taped or glued on. However, it's only stated that SOME of the phones have this particular issue, not all of the W300i series have this problem. Also it's noted that some of the batteries that are inserted into the phone swell up within a month or so.
