= ISMACryp =

The ISMA Encryption and Authentication, Version 1.1 specification (or ISMACryp) specifies encryption and message authentication services for MPEG-4 over RTP streams. It was defined by the Internet Streaming Media Alliance and published on September 15, 2006.

The ISMA Encryption and Authentication, Version 2.0 specifies content encryption, message authentication (integrity) services, an RTP payload format and a file format for pre-encrypted content for ISMA 1.0, ISMA 2.0 and more generally any media that can be stored as elementary stream in an ISO base media file format (ISO/IEC 14496-12). The specification was published on 15 November 2007. ISMACryp specification defined extensions over the ISO base media file format, which were registered by the registration authority for code-points in "MP4 Family" files. The ISMACryp 2.0 specification in an informative "Annex F" provides guidelines on how ISMACryp can be used together with the key and rights management system of OMA DRM v2 (Open Mobile Alliance DRM). The Packetized OMA DRM Content Format is almost based on ISMACryp format.

There are two alternatives to ISMACryp, SRTP and IPsec, that can also be used to provide service and content protection. The difference between the three is at what level encryption is done. Whereas ISMACryp encrypts MPEG-4 access units (that are in the RTP payload), SRTP encrypts the whole RTP payload, and IPsec encrypts packets at .
