= Ut Video Codec Suite =

UT Video Codec Suite
- Original author: Takeshi Umezawa
- Release: April 18, 2008; 18 years ago
- Stable release: 23.2.0 / June 6, 2025; 13 months ago
- Written in: C++
- Operating system: Windows, OS X
- Size: 7.38 MB
- Type: Video Codec
- License: GPL
- Website: umezawa.dyndns.info/wordpress/
- Repository: github.com/umezawatakeshi/utvideo

UT Video Codec Suite is a fast, lossless video codec, developed by Takeshi Umezawa (梅澤 威志, Umezawa Takeshi) and released under the free GNU General Public License. The algorithm of UT video is based on the Huffman code.

UT video was developed as an alternative to HuffYUV, in order to achieve better compression. It can handle color spaces such as YUV422 (ULY2), RGB (ULRG), RGBA (ULRA) and, most recently, YUV420 (ULY0).

It has both x86 and x64 builds. Due to its multithreading support, this codec is also capable of encoding HDTV material in real time. The codec requires support for the SSE2 instruction set because it is heavily used for speed optimizations.

UT video uses the following FOURCC codes: ULY0, ULY2, ULRA, ULRG.

It is used in the screen recording software OBS Studio and video editing software KDenLive when set to "Lossless" video quality.
