= RivaTuner =

Freeware overclocking and hardware monitoring program

- RivaTuner main menu with ATI video card
- Developer: Alexey Nicolaychuk
- Stable release: 7.2.3.20686 / June 21, 2013
- Operating system: Microsoft Windows
- Type: Windows Registry Tweaking
- License: Freeware
- Website: RivaTuner English Homepage and RivaTuner Russian Homepage (in Russian)

RivaTuner is a freeware overclocking and hardware monitoring program that was first developed by Alexey Nicolaychuk in 1997 for Nvidia's video cards. It was a pioneering application that influenced (and in some cases was integrated into) the design of subsequent freeware graphics card overclocking and monitoring utilities. It supports Nvidia GPUs from the Riva TNT to the GeForce 700 series, and has limited support for the ATI/AMD Radeon series of video cards from the Radeon 8500 and above.

For users of supported GPUs, RivaTuner is one of the most commonly used software tools for overclocking. It allows the user to perform driver-level Direct3D and OpenGL tweaking through a graphical interface, and also enables low-level hardware monitoring. It supported Nvidia drivers from versions Detonator 2.08 to the ForceWare versions released in 2009. RivaTuner currently works with Windows 2000, Windows Server 2003 x32, Windows XP, Windows Vista, Windows 7, Windows 8, Windows 10 and Windows 11. It also works with the older Windows 98, 98 SE and ME, but without official support.

RivaTuner was last updated in 2009. It has since been licensed by computer hardware vendors and integrated into various overclocking utilities, including MSI Afterburner, EVGA Precision X (prior to version 16), and ASUS GPU Tweak. In 2014, EVGA terminated its contract with Alexey and was subsequently discovered to have engaged in source code theft after releasing a clone of RivaTuner that was claimed to be an in-house design. The resulting community reaction caused EVGA to redesign its overclocking tool.

RivaTuner Statistics Server (RTSS), which was initially a companion software to RivaTuner, has since evolved into a frame rate and hardware monitor that supports video capture and frame limiting. Unlike RivaTuner, RTSS continues to receive updates and, as of 2017, supports performance monitoring on the latest graphics cards and APIs. RTSS is bundled with MSI Afterburner, but MSI Afterburner does not require the installation of RTSS to function. Due to the Russian invasion of Ukraine and associated economic sanctions, MSI has halted its licensing payments to the developers since 2022, but stated that it still plans to continue using RTSS as the core of Afterburner.

== Features ==
Some features of RivaTuner are:

- Multi-monitor support.
- Built-in registry editor.
- Overclocking tool.
- Support hardware monitoring module from NVIDIA and ATI Technologies.
- Fan control.
- Supports Logitech G15 LCD panel.

== See also ==
- Tweaking
- Overclocking
