= 4GV =

Speech codec used by CDMA networks

4GV is a suite of voice speech codecs developed by Qualcomm for use in CDMA networks. The suite allows network operators to dynamically prioritize voice quality, which can help to increase network capacity while maintaining voice quality. The 4GV suite includes EVRC-B and EVRC-WB.

Qualcomm introduced the 4GV suite to increase network capacity on CDMA2000 Networks significantly. This technology allows for more efficient use of network resources, leading to improved call quality and increased network capacity.

The suite includes two codecs: EVRC-B and EVRC-WB. EVRC-B, or Enhanced Variable Rate Codec B, is a speech codec that provides high-quality voice communication over a wide range of bit rates2. EVRC-WB, or Enhanced Variable Rate Codec Wideband, is a wideband speech codec that provides high-quality voice communication over a wide range of bit rates but with a wider frequency than EVRC-B2.
