= Enhanced Variable Rate Codec B =

Speech codec used by CDMA networks

Enhanced Variable Rate Codec B (EVRC-B) is a speech codec used by CDMA networks. EVRC-B is an enhancement to EVRC and compresses each 20 milliseconds of 8000 Hz, 16-bit sampled speech input into output frames of one of the four different sizes: Rate 1 - 171 bits, Rate 1/2 - 80 bits, Rate 1/4 - 40 bits, Rate 1/8 - 16 bits.

In addition, there are two zero bit codec frame types: null frames and erasure frames, similar to EVRC. One significant enhancement in EVRC-B is the use of 1/4 rate frames that were not used in EVRC. This provides lower average data rates (ADRs) compared to EVRC, for a given voice quality.

The new 4GV Codecs used in CDMA2000 are based on EVRC-B. 4GV is designed to allow service providers to dynamically prioritize voice capacity on their network as required.

The Enhanced Variable Rate Coder (EVRC) is a speech codec used for cellular telephony in cdma2000 systems. EVRC provides excellent speech quality using variable rate coding with 3 possible rates, 8.55, 4.0 and 0.8 kbit/s. However, the Quality of Service (QoS) in cdma2000 systems can significantly benefit from a codec which allows tradeoffs between voice quality and network capacity, which cannot be achieved efficiently with the EVRC.

An upgrade of the EVRC vocoder, known as EVRC-B, was recently introduced by 3GPP2. The EVRC-B speech codec is based on the 4GV concept and is the newest and most advanced speech codec for cellular applications. In addition to the Relaxed Code Excitation Linear Prediction (RCELP) used by EVRC, EVRC-B uses Prototype Pitch Period (PPP) approach for coding of stationary voice frames and Noise Excitation Linear Prediction (NELP) for efficient coding of unvoiced or noise frames. Using NELP and PPP coding at 2.0 kbit/s provides EVRC-B with superior flexibility in rate assignment, allowing it to operate at several operating points, each with a different trade-off between speech quality and system capacity. EVRC-B replaced EVRC as the main speech codec for cdma2000 and its first network commercial deployment started in 2007. A wideband extension, EVRC-WB, provides speech quality that exceeds regular wireline telephony and its standardization process was completed at the summer of 2007. EVRC-WB uses a modified discrete cosine transform (MDCT) audio coding algorithm.

EVRC-B can be also used in 3GPP2 container file format - 3G2.
