= CAI Format =

Audio/video format

CAI format is an ultra-high compression, scalable, hierarchical audio/video format initially developed by Jorg Nonnenmacher in February 2000.

CAI format exists for live and file-based content. Files in CAI format have the ending .cai. All common formats used in audio/video production, distribution, and consumption can be transcoded to CAI format. To obtain CAI format, transcoding products can transform common audio/video formats used in content production, distribution, and consumption to CAI format.

PreciseStatistics developed the live and on-demand transcoding products for the CAI format and provides services and technology based on the CAI format under the Caipy brand.
