= Enhanced Variable Rate Codec =

Speech codec used by CDMA networks

Enhanced Variable Rate CODEC (EVRC) is a speech codec used in CDMA networks. It was developed in 1995 to replace the QCELP vocoder which used more bandwidth on the carrier's network, thus EVRC's primary goal was to offer the mobile carriers more capacity on their networks while not increasing the amount of bandwidth or wireless spectrum needed. EVRC uses RCELP technology.

EVRC compresses each 20 milliseconds of 8000 Hz, 16-bit sampled speech input into output frames of one of three different sizes: full rate – 171 bits (8.55 kbit/s), half rate – 80 bits (4.0 kbit/s), eighth rate – 16 bits (0.8 kbit/s). A quarter rate was not included in the original EVRC specification and eventually became part of EVRC-B.

EVRC was replaced by SMV. Recently, however, SMV itself has been replaced by the new CDMA2000 4GV codecs. 4GV is the next generation 3GPP2 standards-based EVRC-B codec. 4GV is designed to allow service providers to dynamically prioritize voice capacity on their network as required.

EVRC can be also used in 3GPP2 container file format - 3G2.
