= OMS Video =

Video compression

OMS Video is an open, royalty-free video compression specification that was under development by Sun Microsystems's Open Media Commons as part of the Open Media Stack. It defines a video decoder and the associated bitstream syntax. It is intended for delivery, storage and playback of video streams.

It was announced on April 11, 2008. The latest version of OMS Video Specification is 0.91, released on June 9, 2009.

== OMS Video design ==
OMS Video is based on an updated version of the H.261 codec as some of the patents on it have now expired. Vorbis is planned for use as the audio codec.

== See also ==
- H.261
- Vorbis
- Video compression
- Open Media Commons
- Dirac (codec)
- Theora
- Codec
- Open source codecs and containers
