= Spirit DSP =

- Company type: Privately held
- Industry: IT, Telecommunications
- Founded: 1992
- Founder: Andrew Sviridenko
- Area served: Worldwide
- Products: TeamSpirit Voice&Video Engine, VideoMost
- Number of employees: 120
- Subsidiaries: VideoMost
- Website: www.spiritdsp.com

Spirit DSP is an international company that develops embedded software for real-time voice and video communication over IP networks – voice and video engines. Its voice and video software platform is used by carriers, mobile messaging apps, and social networks, serving more than 1 billion users in 100 countries.

== History ==
Spirit DSP was founded in 1992. Since 1996 the company is focused on embedded software products for IP communications. Most important competitor was Global IP Solutions, until their acquisition by Google, Inc. and the subsequent release of their most important software products as Free Software.

== Products ==
Spirit's voice and video engines are targeted at various applications – PC and mobile communication applications (softphones, IMS-, Unified Communications and Enterprise Mobility clients), terminal user equipment with IP-connectivity (media phones, IP phones, IP set top boxes, Mobile Internet Devices) and infrastructure equipment (IP gateways, ATAs, media servers, etc.).

Spirit's VoIP software products are media processing libraries. They include standard (like G.723, G.729, H.264, MPEG-4) and proprietary Spirit IPMR voice and video codecs for speech and video compression / decompression, RTP packetizers, echo and noise cancellation, packet loss concealment and error correction, adaptive jitter buffer, audio and video synchronization, CPU load and playback rate control, etc. These components are integrated into a module within application framework.

== Awards and recognition ==
In 2005 and 2007 company was included in "Pulver 100" listing of privately held growth companies deemed to represent the future of the IP-voice and video communications ecosystem. In 2007 Spirit DSP was awarded a Seal of E-Excellence Award at CeBIT for innovative VVoIP technologies in the global market.

Spirit DSP received the 2013 Excellence Award of the Small Business Institute for Excellence in Commerce (SBIEC).
