= Open Media Commons =

The Open Media Commons, sometimes referred to as the Open Media Commons initiative, is a computer industry group whose goal is to "develop open, royalty-free digital rights management and codec solutions". One of their largest supporters is Sun Microsystems, who released their internal digital rights management (DRM) project, Project DReaM, as part of the Open Media Commons initiative on 22 August 2005.

Project DReaM one of several project organized through the Open Media Commons initiative:

- DRM-OPERA: An interoperable DRM architecture that is not dependent upon a specific hardware set or operating system.
- Java Stream Assembly: Java-based server software that allows for distribution of video over a network.
- OMS Video: a royalty-free codec loosely based on the H.261 with new tools & optimizations.
