= Internet Streaming Media Alliance =

The Internet Streaming Media Alliance (ISMA) was a non-profit corporation founded in December 2000, by Apple Computer, Cisco Systems, Kasenna, Philips, and Sun Microsystems. Its stated mission was to accelerate the market adoption of open standards for streaming and progressive download of rich media over all types of Internet Protocols (IP). It was an alliance with representatives from various points of the streaming work-flow.

At the time ISMA was created, standards already existed for audio and video codecs (e.g. MPEG) and for real time streaming transport over IP networks (e.g. RTP). ISMA worked on selecting profiles, describing payload formats, and resolving various options of these standards. ISMA specifications typically adopted existing specifications. However, when specifications did not exist, the ISMA could create them. ISMA also performed interoperability testing, allowing its members to ensure that their products conformed to ISMA standards and interoperate.

== Specifications ==
ISMA released several specifications for the transport of rich media over IP:

- ISMA 1.0 - detailing how to stream MPEG-4 Part 2 video (Simple Profile and Advanced Simple Profile) over IP networks
- ISMA 2.0 - detailing how to stream H.264/MPEG-4 AVC video and HE-AAC audio over IP networks
- ISMACryp - specifying an end-to-end encryption system for ISMA 1.0 and 2.0 streams
- ISMA Closed Captioning - specifying how to carry closed caption (line 21) data as a third stream over an IP network
