= Mike Linksvayer =

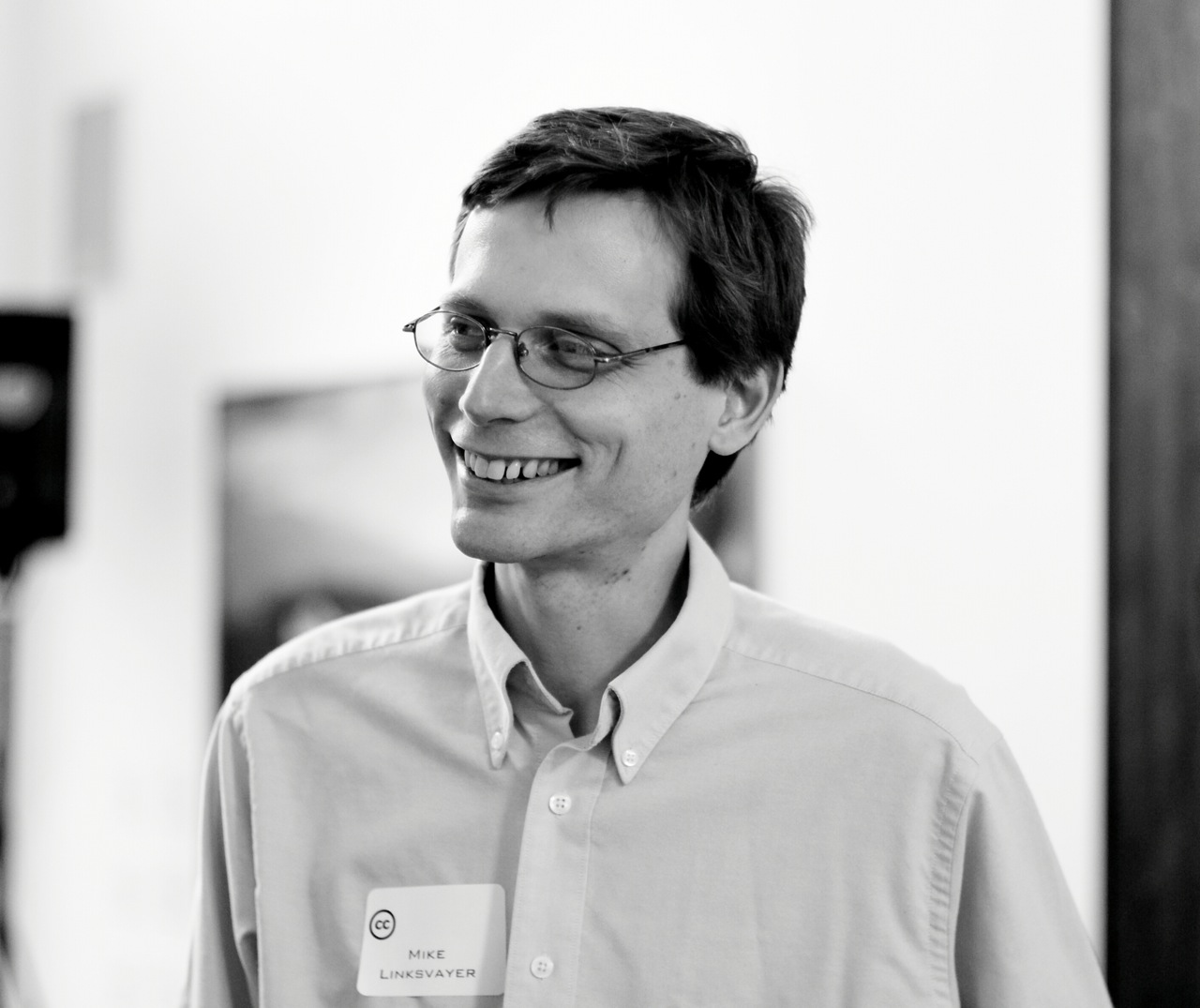
- Mike Linksvayer, by Joi Ito (2007)
- Occupation: Policy Director at GitHub
- Known for: Technology Developer and Entrepreneur

Mike Linksvayer is an intellectual freedom, commons proponent, technology entrepreneur, developer, and activist. He co-founded Bitzi and has been employed by Creative Commons. He is GitHub's Vice President of Policy.

== Biography ==
Linksvayer holds a B.A. in economics from the University of Illinois at Urbana-Champaign and has worked as a chief technical officer, vice president, manager, software developer, and consultant. He joined Creative Commons as CTO in April 2003, and held that position until April 2007 when he became vice president. He also co-founded p2p file sharing company Bitzi, well known for its invention of magnet links.

Former executive director of Creative Commons, Glenn Otis Brown, noted that Mike Linksvayer brought much-needed stability to the organization, comparing his role to that of a drummer in a band.

Linksvayer encouraged NASA to use public APIs to share its data, which is already in public domain as government works. He also suggested that scientists and other planetary societies use Creative Commons licenses to disseminate photos and other works so that the public has better access.

Following his tenure as vice president, in April 2012 Linksvayer became a part-time Senior Fellow at Creative Commons. Linksvayer also serves on the boards of OpenHatch and Software Freedom Conservancy and chairs the Open Definition Advisory Council.

Since 2015, Linksvayer has been GitHub's Director of Policy, addressing public policy issues.

== Writing ==
Linksvayer speaks internationally and writes broadly. On January 30, 2015 he co-authored a whitepaper, "Towards a Design Space for a Commons Provenance System" with Tessa Askamp, Paul Keller, Catharina Maracke, and Maarten Zeinstra.

In 2012, he wrote an essay in the essay collection, The Wealth of the Commons: A World Beyond Market and State, edited by David Bollier. He contributed to Jono Bacon's O'Reilly book, The Art of Community: Building the New Age of Participation and also wrote "Using and Sharing Data: the Black Letter, Fine Print, and Reality" for The Data Journalism Handbook. In 2010 he co-authored with Aleksandar Erkalovic, Adam Hyde, Michael Mandiberg, Marta Peirano, Sissu Tarka, Astra Taylor, Alan Toner, and Mushon Zer-Aviv, Collaborative Futures using the novel Booksprint method of producing and releasing an entire book in a week.

In 2009, Linksvayer contributed an essay "Free Culture in Relation to Software Freedom" to FSCONS Free Beer, edited by Stian Rødven Eide.

In 2008, while at Creative Commons, Linksvayer co-authored a technical document with Ben Adida, Hal Abelson, and Nathan Yergler, "ccREL: The Creative Commons Rights Expression Language."

== Personal life ==
Mike Linksvayer is a vegan and follows a low-calorie diet. He was featured in a news story carried by a number of sources suggesting that calorie-restricted diets may extend life span. He lives in Oakland, California.
