= MSU Lossless Video Codec =

Video codec

- Developer(s): Dmitry Vatolin, Dmitry Popov, Sergey Putilin
- Preview release: 0.6.0 / September 19, 2005; 19 years ago
- Written in: C++
- Operating system: Microsoft Windows
- Platform: IA-32
- Size: 157 KB
- Available in: English
- Type: lossless video codec
- License: Proprietary, free for non-commercial use
- Website: www.compression.ru/video/ls-codec/index_en.html

The MSU Lossless Video Codec is a video codec developed by the Graphics & Media Lab Video Group of Moscow State University. It was designed to provide space-effective lossless video compression. As of 2007 MSU had the second-best compression ratio when compared to many other lossless video codecs, with the better result shown by YULS codec.

== Description ==
MSU Lossless Video Codec is available as a Video for Windows codec. It can be used from such applications as VirtualDub or Adobe Premiere. Possible input formats are RGB24 (RGB), RGB32, YUY2, YUYV and YV12.

The codec is available free of charge for non-commercial use. As of 23 November 2011 the commercial license and the source code of this codec is unavailable.

Despite its name, the codec has several lossy modes.

== Release history ==
| Version | Date | Changes |
|---|---|---|
| 0.6.0 | September 19, 2005 | new compression algorithm implementation; user interface cleanup |
| 0.5.8 | March 20, 2005 | improved Windows 98 support |
| 0.5.6 | February 14, 2005 | improved VirtualDub support |
| 0.5.2 | February 6, 2005 | YV12 support; Adobe Premiere support; speed settings; possibility to avoid P-frames; maximum I-frames configurability; VirtualDub jobs support |
| 0.2.4p | October 1, 2004 | Windows 98 support |
| 0.2.4 | September 24, 2004 | Initial public release |
