= Long-term Predicted Excitation Coding =

Sony codec optimised for voice recording

Long-term Predicted Excitation Coding refers to a technique used in speech and audio processing to efficiently represent and transmit long-term information by predicting the excitation signal over time. In digital signal processing, long-term predicted excitation coding is a codec developed by Sony for voice recording. It is the standard codec in several Sony digital voice recorders. The codec is proprietary, and no developer details are available as of early 2007. Typical file extensions are .DVF and .MSV.
