= YULS =

Lossless video codec

YUVsoft's Lossless Video Codec
- Original author: Maxim Smirnov
- Developer: YUVsoft
- Stable release: 1.0.3
- Written in: C++
- Operating system: Microsoft Windows
- Platform: IA-32
- Available in: English
- Type: lossless video codec
- License: Proprietary, free for non-commercial use
- Website: www.yuvsoft.com/2d-technologies/lossless-video-codec/

YULS or YUVsoft's Lossless Video Codec, a lossless video codec developed by YUVsoft, was designed to produce highly compressed lossless video. YULS compares favorably, in terms of compression ratio, with other codecs.

== Releases ==
Version	Changes
1.0.3	compression ratio improved by 5%
1.0.2	YV12 and YUY2 are no longer converted to RGB24; 2–4% speed increase; Handling of incorrect state loading
1.0.1	2–3% speed increase; persistent state; error handling improved; dialog windows reworked
1.0.0	Initial public release
