= Tweaking =

Fine adjustments to a system

Tweaking refers to fine-tuning or adjusting a complex system, usually an electronic device. Tweaks are any small modifications intended to improve a system.

In electronics, it is a synonym for "trimming." Analog circuit boards often have small potentiometers or other components on them that are used to calibrate or adjust the board as a service procedure: the small insulated screwdriver used to turn them is often called a "tweaker."

This use was echoed in the name of the product Tweek, a popular but controversial audio product during the 1980s, which was claimed to improve the electrical characteristics of audio switch contacts.

== Hardware ==
Hardware tweaking is a process of modifying certain parts of a hardware such as changing the cables, cleaning the heads of a VCR with a branded cleaning fluid or oiling the moving parts of an engine with the best possible oil.

== Computer hardware ==
Computer hardware tweaking is an extension of hardware tweaking, specifically geared towards the components of a PC. They include: changing voltage and clock rates of processing units, modifying RAM unit timing, improving cooling systems to reduce chance of overheating, etc.

Tweaks specifically designed to allow a processor to operate at a higher clock speed than normal are known as overclocking.

Modifications of computer systems not aimed at increasing performance, such as quieter fans, external controls, and decorations such as lights or windows, are known as modding.

== Software ==
Software tweaking is the process of improving the performance of an application or the quality of its output. There can be two ways of accomplishing this: manually (that is, if one is familiar with programming; though it may be irrelevant if the source of the application is closed, and there are no built-in means to adjust its performance) or using another piece of software specialized for that purpose. Tweaking of this kind generally increases usability, in terms of personal configuration preferences, rather than objective performance of the system overall).

More precise applications usually require more and higher-quality tweaking to produce accurate results.

== See also ==
- Overclocking
- Modding
- TweakUI
