= Qualcomm code-excited linear prediction =

Speech codec by Qualcomm

Qualcomm PureVoice
- Filename extension: .qcp
- Internet media type: audio/qcelp
- Developed by: Qualcomm
- Initial release: 1994; 31 years ago
- Latest release: TIA IS-733; December 1999; 26 years ago
- Type of format: Lossy audio
- Open format?: Yes
- Free format?: No

Qualcomm code-excited linear prediction (QCELP), also known as Qualcomm PureVoice, is a speech codec developed in 1994 by Qualcomm to increase the speech quality of the IS-96A codec earlier used in CDMA networks. It was later replaced with EVRC to achieve better speech quality with fewer bits. The two versions, QCELP8 and QCELP13, operate at 8 and 13 kilobits per second (Kbit/s) respectively.

In CDMA systems, a QCELP vocoder converts a sound signal into a signal transmissible within a circuit. In wired systems, voice signals are generally sampled at 8 kHz (that is, 8,000 sample values per second) and then encoded by 8-bit quantization for each sample value. Such a system transmits at 64 kbit/s, an expensive rate in a wireless system. A QCELP vocoder with variable rates can reduce the rate enough to fit a wireless system by coding the information more efficiently. In particular, it can change its own coding rates based on the speaker's volume or pitch; a louder or higher-pitched voice requires a higher rate.
