= Selectable Mode Vocoder =

Speech codec used by CDMA2000 networks

Selectable Mode Vocoder (SMV) is variable bitrate speech coding standard used in CDMA2000 networks. SMV provides multiple modes of operation that are selected based on input speech characteristics.

== Technical specification ==
=== Codecs ===
The SMV for Wideband CDMA is based on 4 codecs: full rate at 8.5 kbit/s, half rate at 4 kbit/s, quarter rate at 2 kbit/s, and eighth rate at 800 bit/s. The full rate and half rate are based on the CELP algorithm that is based on a combined closed-loop-open-loop-analysis (COLA). In SMV the signal frames are first classified as:

- Silence/Background noise
- Non-stationary unvoiced
- Stationary unvoiced
- Onset
- Non-stationary voiced
- Stationary voiced

=== Algorithm ===
The algorithm includes voice activity detection (VAD) followed by an elaborate frame classification scheme. Silence/background noise and stationary unvoiced frames are represented by spectrum-modulated noise and coded at 1/4 or 1/8 rate. The SMV uses 4 subframes for full rate and two/three subframes for half rate. The stochastic (fixed) codebook structure is also elaborate and uses sub-codebooks each tuned for a particular type of speech. The sub-codebooks have different degrees of pulse sparseness (more sparse for noise like excitation). SMV scores a high of 3.6 MOS at full rate with clean speech.

The coder works on a frame of 160 speech samples (20 ms) and requires a look ahead of 80 samples (10 ms) if noise-suppression option B is used. An additional 24 samples of look ahead is required if noise-suppression option A is used. So the algorithmic delay for the coder is 30 ms with noise-suppression option B and 33 ms with noise-suppression option A.

The next evolution of CDMA speech codecs is VMR-WB which provides much higher speech quality with wideband while fitting to the same networks.

SMV can be also used in 3GPP2 container file format – 3G2.
