= 60th Technology and Engineering Emmy Awards =

2009 awards ceremony

- Date: January 8, 2009
- Location: International Consumer Electronics Show, Las Vegas
- Website: http://www.emmyonline.org/tech/

The 60th Technology and Engineering Emmy Awards was held on January 8, 2009 at the 2009 International Consumer Electronics Show in Las Vegas. CEO of Verizon Communications, Ivan Seidenberg received the Lifetime Achievement Award

== Awardees ==
- Serial Interface and Protocols for Server/VTR control
  - Harris Corporation
  - Sony
- Delivery Confirmation Systems
  - XOrbit
  - Scripps Networks
- Development and Standardization of File Formats for Video and Audio
  - Society of Motion Picture and Television Engineers (SMPTE)
  - Thomson Grass Valley
- Pioneering Development of MPEG-4 AVC systems for HDTV
  - Tandberg Television
  - DirecTV
- Pioneering RF Combiners for Adjacent Channels on Common Antenna Systems
  - Harris Corporation
  - Micro Communications Inc. (MCI)
  - Radio Frequency Systems (RFS)
- Ongoing live global HD cinemacasting
  - Metropolitan Opera Association
- Developing HDMI
  - Silicon Image
  - Thomson Multimédia
  - Toshiba
  - Sony
  - Matsushita
  - Hitachi
  - Philips
  - Molex
  - Japan Aviation Electronics (JAE)
  - Intel
- Standardization of the ATSC Digital System
  - Advisory Committee on Advanced Television Service
  - Advanced Television System Committee
  - Advanced Television Test Center
  - Advanced Television Evaluation Laboratory
- MPEG-4 AVC Standard
  - Video Coding Experts Group (VCEG)
  - Moving Picture Experts Group (MPEG)
