= 59th Technology and Engineering Emmy Awards =

Annual awards ceremony

- Date: January 8, 2008
- Location: International Consumer Electronics Show, Las Vegas
- Website: http://www.emmyonline.org/tech/

The 59th Technology and Engineering Emmy Awards was held on January 8, 2008 at the 2008 International Consumer Electronics Show in Las Vegas.

== Awardee ==
The Emmy Awards for ATSC broadcast transmission system RF filters:

- Electronics Research Inc.
- Dielectric Communications
- Harris Broadcast
- Micro Communications Inc.

The Emmy Awards for Development... of interactive Video on Demand infrastructure and signaling, leading to large scale VOD implementations:

- Time Warner Cable
- Scientific Atlanta
- N2 Broadband (Tandberg Television)

The Emmy Award for Coaxial cable technology:

- AT&T

The Emmy Award for Pioneering development of a fully monitored fiber optic based digital network at shared use sports venues:

- Vyvx Services

The Emmy Award for Development and implementation of an integrated and portable IP-based live, edit and store-and-forward digital news-gathering system:

- CNN

The Emmy Awards for Monitoring for compliance standards for ATSC & DVB transport streams:

- Rohde & Schwarz
- Tektronix
- Thomson
- Pixelmetrix Corporation

The advanced media technology winners for Science, Engineering & Technology for Broadband & Personal Television:

The Awards for Outstanding Achievement in Advanced Media Technology for Best Use of Commercial Advertising on Personal Computer:

- The L Word in Second Life, Showtime Networks/Electric Sheep Company

The Awards for Outstanding Achievement in Advanced Media Technology for Best Use for Creation and Distribution of Interactive Commercial Advertising Delivered Through Digital Set Top Boxes:

- Axe Boost Your E.S.P. Interactive Channel Experience, Brightline iTV/Unilever

The Awards for Outstanding Achievement in Advanced Media Technology for Synchronous Enhancement of Original Television Content for Interactive Use (Two Screen Environment TV /PC or TV / Mobile Device):

- March Madness on Demand, CBSSports.com/CBS Sports

The Awards for Outstanding Achievement in Advanced Media Technology for Creation of Non-Traditional Programs or Platforms:

- MTV's Virtual Laguna Beach, MTV Networks

The Awards for Outstanding Achievement in Advanced Media Technology for Best Use of Personal Media Display and Presentation Technology (PSP, Cell Phone, Personal Media Player, Mobile Devices):

- Bravo To Go, Bravo

The Awards for Outstanding Achievement in Advanced Media Technology for Best Use of "On Demand" (Consumer Scheduled or Programmed) Technology Over Broadband Networks for Active "lean-forward" Viewing:

- MLB Mosaic, Ensequence/MLB.TV

The Awards for Outstanding Achievement in Advanced Media Technology for Best Use of "On Demand" for Passive "lean-backward" Viewing:

- Switched Digital Video: Revolutionizing TV, Time Warner Cable/BigBand Networks

Following are the winners for Engineering & Technology for Creation and Implementation of Video Games and Platforms:

The Awards for Game Controller Innovation:

- Nintendo DS, Nintendo,
- Wii, Nintendo

The Awards for Handheld Game Device Display Screen Innovation:

- Football & Auto Race – Mattel Electronics
- Atari Lynx – Atari Corporation
- Nintendo DS – Nintendo

The Awards for User-Generated Content – Game Modification:

- Pinball Construction Set – Bill Budge & Electronic Arts
- Quake – John Carmack & id Software
- Second Life – Philip Rosedale & Linden Lab

The Award for Physics Engines:

- Havok

The Awards for Development of Massively Multiplayer Online Graphical Role Playing Games (MMORPG):

- Neverwinter Nights – Don Daglow & Stormfront Studios, AOL-Time Warner, Wizards of the Coast,
- EverQuest – Sony Online Entertainment
- World of Warcraft – Mike Morhaime & Blizzard Entertainment

The Awards for Visual Digital Content Creation Tools and their Impact:

- Maya, Autodesk
- 3D Studio Max, Autodesk
