= Technology and Engineering Emmy Awards =

Award for engineering development in television technology

Technology and Engineering Emmy Award
- Awarded for: Outstanding achievement in technical or engineering development
- Country: United States
- Presented by: NATAS
- Website: theemmys.tv/tech

The Technology and Engineering Emmy Awards, or Technology and Engineering Emmys, are one of two sets of Emmy Awards that are presented for outstanding achievement in engineering development in the television industry. The Technology and Engineering Emmy Awards are presented by the National Academy of Television Arts and Sciences (NATAS), while the separate Primetime Engineering Emmy Awards are given by its sister organization, the Academy of Television Arts & Sciences (ATAS).

A Technology and Engineering Emmy can be presented to an individual, a company, or to a scientific or technical organization for developments and/or standardization involved in engineering technologies which either represent so extensive an improvement on existing methods or are so innovative in nature that they materially have affected the transmission, recording, or reception of television. The award is determined by a special panel composed of highly qualified, experienced engineers in the television industry.

== 2024 Awards ==
The 76th annual Technology & Engineering Emmy Awards were as follows.

Pioneering Standardization of VOD Asset Metadata Distribution Specifications

- CableLabs

360 Degree Consumer Video Capture, Editing and Presentation Technologies

- GoPro
- Insta360
- Google
- Adobe
- Apple
- ByteDance

Specification for AV1

- Alliance for Open Media

SMPTE ST 2067 — Standardization of Interoperable Master Format (IMF)

- SMPTE/IMF USER GROUP
- Advanced Media Workflow Association
- Digital Cinema Initiatives
- USC-ETC

Pioneering Mastering HDR Display

- Dolby Labs

AI Image/Video Enhancement for High Quality TV Catalog Restoration

- MTI Film
- Topaz Labs

Standardization of Common Media Application Format (CMAF)

- MPEG Systems (ISO/IEC JTC 1/SC 29/WG 3)

Pioneering Concepts of the Light Valve

- Michael Faraday and John Kerr

Pioneering Development of the Photocell

- Alexandre-Edmond Becquerel, Julius Johann, Phillipp Ludwig Elster and Hans Friedrich Karl Geitel

Pioneering Development of Optical-Input Facsimile Transmission

- Carlo Mario Perosino, Édouard Belin and Arthur Korn

== 2023 Awards ==
The 75th annual Technology & Engineering Emmy Awards were as follows.

Excellence in Production Technology Award: The Santa Clauses, Season 2, Disney+ / Industrial Light & Magic

- David Hirschfield, Matthew Lausch, Stephen Hill, Alan Bucior, Scott Richards, Matthew O'Neil, Nick Rasmussen, Mike Jutan, Rodney Huff, Jose Luis Gomez Diaz

Pioneering Development of Inexpensive Video Technology for Animation

- Lyon Lamb (Bruce Lyon and John Lamb)

Large Scale Deployment of Smart TV Operating Systems

- Samsung
- LG
- Sony
- Vizio
- Panasonic

Creation and Implementation of HDR Static LUT, Single-Stream Live Production

- BBC
- NBC

Pioneering Technologies Enabling High Performance Communications Over Cable TV Systems

- Broadcom
- General Instrument (CommScope)
- LANcity (CommScope)
- 3COM (HP)

Pioneering Development of Manifest-based Playout for FAST (Free Ad-supported Streaming Television)

- Amagi
- Pluto TV
- Turner

Targeted Ad Messages Delivered Across Paused Media

- DirecTV

Pioneering Development of IP Address Geolocation Technologies to Protect Content Rights

- MLB
- Quova

Development of Stream Switching Technology between Satellite Broadcast and Internet to Improve Signal Reliability

- DirecTV

Design and Deployment of Efficient Hardware Video Accelerators for Cloud

- Netint
- AMD
- Google
- Meta

Spectrum Auction Design

- FCC
- Auctionomics

TV Pioneers – Cathode Ray Tubes (CRT)

- Karl Ferdinand Braun
- Boris Lvovich Rosing
- Alan Archibald Campbell Swinton

TV Pioneers – Development of lighting, ventilation, and lens-coating technologies

- Hertha Ayrton
- Katharine Burr Blodgett

== 2022 Awards ==
The 74th annual Technology & Engineering Emmy Awards were as follows.

Invention and Development of the Pinned Photodiode Now Used in Most Image Sensors

- Nobukazu Teranishi
- NEC

Extraction of Granular Census Level Behavioral Data using ACR

- Cognitive Networks
- Enswers
- Turner Media lab

AI-ML curation of Sports Highlights

- WSC Sports
- IBM
- Comcast
- Google

Digital Cinema Camera Mounted Video Extender for Live Audiences

- MultiDyne
- ARRI

Pioneering Development and Deployment of Virtualized Cable Modem

- Harmonic
- Comcast
- Intel

TV Pioneer Hall of Fame

- Llewelyn Birchall Atkinson
- Jean Lazare Weiller
- Thomas Alva Edison
- Jan Szczepanik
- Constantin Dmitrievich Perskyi

== 2021 Awards ==
The 73rd annual Technology & Engineering Emmy Awards were as follows.

Video & Audio Search based on Index Feeds coming from Multiple Sources

- Shadow TV

In Camera Sensor and Software Stabilization

- GoPro
- Socionext

Correlated Double Sampling for Image Sensors

- Marvin H. White
- Northrop Grumman Mission Systems Group

Pioneering Development of an Image-Sensor Array with Buried-Photodiode Structure

- Peter J. W. Noble

Standardization of Font Technology for Custom Downloadable Fonts and Typography for Web and TV Devices

- MPEG
- W3C – WebFonts Working Group

Common Key Technology of OTT Content

- Apple
- MLB Advanced Media
- Microsoft
- Netflix

Development of the Event Scheduling and Notification Interface (ESNI)

- Cable Labs
- OATC
- SCTE

Cloud Enabled Remote Editing and Project Management

- Arvato Systems Group
- EditShare
- Ross Video (Primestream)

Pioneering Development of Technologies to collect granular linear TV Viewership Data including STBs, ACR, Connected TV's for Measurement, Marketing & Advertising

- Bell South
- Cablevision
- DIRECTV
- NCM Solutions

Standardization of HTTP Encapsulated Protocols

- Apple
- MLB Advanced Media
- MPEG
- 3GPP

Management of IP Multicast Video Distribution to Desktops and TVs in News & Media Production Facilities

- Haivision
- VITEC

== 2020 Awards ==
The 72nd annual Technology & Engineering Emmy Awards were as follows.

System to Measure Video Performances and Demographics across multiple platforms

- Nielsen

Pioneering Development and Deployment of Server-side Ad Manipulation and/or Playout for Adaptive Bitrate Video Distribution

- mDialog, Anvato (Google)
- NBCU
- This Technology (Comcast)
- Seawell (Commscope)
- TimeWarner Cable (Charter)

Development of Open Perceptual Metrics for Video Encoding Optimization

- Beamr
- Netflix
- University of Southern California
- Université de Nantes
- University of Texas at Austin
- SSIMWAVE
- Disney
- Google
- Brightcove
- Ateme

Development of the Event Signaling and Management API Standard

- CableLabs
- Comcast
- Time Warner Cable (Charter)
- SCTE

Pioneering Deployment of the Event Signaling and Management API

- Time Warner Cable (Charter)
- Arris (Commscope)
- Cisco
- Envivio (MediaKind)
- Harmonic
- RGB Networks
- This Technology (Comcast)

Pioneering development of LED lighting for Television Production

- Litepanels LTD (Vitec Production Solutions)

Cross-MVPD Dynamic Ad Insertion for Cable Network Video on Demand Content

- Canoe Ventures

AI/Optimization for Real-Time Video Compression

- Harmonic
- MediaKind
- Ateme
- Amazon Web Services

Invention and Pioneering Development of Intra-Pixel Charge Transfer CMOS Image Sensors

- Eric Fossum
- ON Semiconductor
- Eastman Kodak

Standardization of SMPTE ST 2110

- SMPTE
- Video Services Forum

Common Encryption

- European Broadcasting Union
- DVB

Content Delivery Networks

- Akamai Technologies

Standardization and Commercialization of Television – Broadcast, Hybrid Electrical and Fiber-Optic Camera Cable and Connectors

- SMPTE
- Association of Radio Industries and Businesses
- European Broadcasting Union
- LEMO
- Belden
- NEMAL

OLED Reference Monitors for Creative, Technical, Quality Control and Client Viewing

- LG Electronics
- Sony Electronics

Dynamic Metadata for optimal HDR and WCG color volume mapping

- Dolby Laboratories

Advanced Authoring Format

- AAF Association (AMWA)
- Avid Technology
- BBC Research & Development
- European Broadcasting Union

Pioneering secure cloud-based VFX project management and collaboration at scale

- Nelvana (Corus Entertainment)
- Shotgun Software (Autodesk)

Development and Pioneering Deployment of Synchronized Local DMA Advertising Capability for DBS / MVPD's

- Ampersand
- Comcast
- Charter
- Cox
- AT&T
- Dish
- Invidi

Standardization of the ISO Base Media File Format

- File Format Subgroup under ISO/IEC JTC 1/SC 29/WG 3 (MPEG Systems)

On-air Touch Screen for Data Visualization

- CBS
- CNN

Development of Massive Processing Optimized Compression Technologies

- Amazon
- Ateme
- Bitmovin
- Brightcove
- Disney
- Encoding.com
- Facebook
- Google-YouTube
- Netflix

Newsroom Computer System (NRCS) used to plan and automate the production of linear live-to-air or live-to-recording news program

- Associated Press
- Avid Technology

== 2019 Awards ==
The 71st annual Technology & Engineering Emmy Awards were as follows.

Pioneering System for Live Performance-Based Animation Using Facial Recognition

- Adobe

HTML5 Development and Deployment of a Full TV Experience on Any Device

- Apple
- Google
- LG
- Microsoft
- Mozilla
- Opera TV (Vewd)
- Samsung

Pioneering Public Cloud Based Linear Media Supply Chains

- AWS
- Discovery
- Evertz
- FOX NE&O (Walt Disney Television)
- SDVI

Pioneering Development of Large Scale, Cloud Served, Broadcast Quality, Linear Channel Transmission to Consumers

- Sling TV
- Sony PlayStation Vue
- Zattoo

Early Development of HSM Systems that Created a Pivotal Improvement in Broadcast Workflows

- Dell (Isilon)
- IBM
- Masstech
- Quantum

Pioneering Development and Deployment of Hybrid Fiber Coax Network Architecture

- Cable Labs

Pioneering Development of the CCD Image Sensor

- Bell Labs
- Michael Tompsett

VoCIP (Video over Bonded Cellular Internet)

- AVI WEST
- Dejero
- LiveU
- TVU Networks

Ultra-High Sensitivity HDTV Camera

- Canon
- Flovel

Development of Synchronized multi-channel uncompressed audio transport over IP Networks

- ALC NetworX
- Audinate
- Audio Engineering Society
- Kevin Gross
- QSC
- Telos Alliance
- Wheatstone

== 2018 Awards ==
The 70th annual Technology & Engineering Emmy Awards were as follows.

Pioneering Development of Mobile X-Band Radar Trucks for Television Weather Forecasting and Reporting

- NBCUniversal Company Owned Stations
- Accelerated Media Technologies Inc.
- Enterprise Electronics Corporation (EEC)

Automated Sound Conformation

- Sounds in Sync
- Synchro Arts
- The Cargo Cult

3D Engine Software for the Production of Animation

- Unity Technologies
- Epic Games Inc.

Cost Effective Crowd Simulation Tools

- Massive
- Golaem
- Basefount
- SideFX

Pioneering Development of Packet Impairment Test Generator for SMPTE ST 2022 Digital Video over IP

- Packetstorm

Development of a Ku Satellite-Based Communication System for Early Satellite Newsgathering

- NBC
- Conus Communications (Hubbard Broadcasting)

Large-Scale “At Home” Production for Live Sports

- NASCAR Productions
- PSSI Global Services
- Big Ten Network

Large-Scale Distributed Production for Live Sports

- NBC Sports

Standardization of HTML5, Encrypted Media Extensions (EME) and Media Source Extensions (MSE) for a Full TV Experience

- W3C
- Microsoft
- Comcast
- Netflix
- Google

Pioneering Reliable Transmission Method for Live Contribution and Distribution TV Links

- Fujitsu
- Qvidium
- Net Insight
- VideoFlow
- DVEO
- Artel
- Haivision
- Cobalt
- Zixi
- AVI West
- Streambox
- Dejero

Pioneering Development of the Single-Chip Color Camera

- Peter Dillon
- Al Brault
- Hitachi
- NEC
- Panasonic
- Sony
- Toshiba

== 2017 Awards ==
The 69th annual Technology & Engineering Emmy Awards were as follows.

Contextual Voice Navigation for Discovering and Interacting with TV Content

- Comcast
- Universal Electronics Inc (UEI)
- Apple TV
- Nuance Dragon TV

Low Latency Remote Controlled Airborne Video Platforms (non-military) for Television

- John McGraw
- PictorVision Inc.
- Aerial MOB LLC
- Astraeus Aerial
- Flying Cam Inc.
- Vortex Aerial
- Helivideo Productions LLC
- Snaproll Media LLC
- DJI

Pioneering and Productization of Supporting Digital Video Using SDI Over Fiber-Optic

- Bluebell
- British Telecom

Pioneering Development of a Computerized Hard-Disk Storage Based Digital Non-Linear, Multi-Stream Multi-Camera System

- Avid Technology
- Heavyworks (Edit Share)

Pioneering Development of a Portable, Battery Powered Audio/Video Test Signal Generator

- MultiDyne

Development of Integrated Consumer Video Conferencing Service into Broadcast Production Environments and Workflows

- Skype (Microsoft)

Video Identification Technology to Protect Content Value and Copyright

- Audible Magic
- Civolution
- INA
- Friend MTS
- Vobile
- YouTube

Expanding-Side Television Production Mobile Units

- CBS Television Network
- The Gerstenslager Company

A Three Dimensional Doppler Radar System to Track and Display Fast Moving Pitched and Hit Balls

- TrackMan
- MLB Advanced Media
- ChyronHego Corporation

== 2016 Awards ==
The 68th annual Technology & Engineering Emmy Awards were as follows.

Live Production Technology Beyond HD to Achieve Non-Interpolated Video for Instant Replay

- Evertz
- EVS
- FOR-A

Concept of Opto-Electric Transduction

- Telcon (Alcatel Lucent-Submarine Networks)
- Society of Telegraph Engineers (Institution of Engineering and Technology)
- Siemens

Development and Standardization of Media Object Server (MOS) Protocol

- Media Object Server (MOS) Group

System for Executing Targeted Household Advertising on Linear Television

- Invidi Technologies
- Visible World

Pioneering Invention and Deployment of Fiber Optic Cable

- Corning
- Bell Labs/Western Electric (OFS)

Pioneering Technology to Automate the Digital On-Line Assembly of Broadcast Content

- IBM Corporation
- Laser Pacific/SCAA (Technicolor)

== 2015 Awards ==
The 67th annual Technology & Engineering Emmy Awards were as follows.

Pioneering Optimization of Advertising Placement in Single Channel Linear Television Programs

- BCS

Standardization and Pioneering Development of Non-Live Broadband Captioning

- Netflix
- Home Box Office (HBO)
- Telestream
- SMPTE
- W3C

Open Modular Platform for Broadcast and Production Distribution and Conversion Equipment

- Ross Video

Development and Standardization of HDBaseT Connectivity Technology for Commercial and Residential HDMI/DVI Installations

- Valens Semiconductor

Phonetic Indexing and Timing

- Nexidia Inc.

Steganographic Technologies for Audio/Video

- Nielsen
- Civolution
- Digimarc
- Verance

Pre-production Visualization System

- Autodesk
- Cast-Soft
- Innoventive Software
- Robert Abel

The Concept of Scanning for Image Transmission

- Alexander Bain

Pioneering Development of Data Driven Traffic Systems for Multichannel Environments

- Management Science Associates, Inc
- Turner

Development of Enabling Technology for High Density Video Switching and Routing Solutions

- MACOM

Closed-loop Statistical Multiplexing of Geographically Distributed Encoders

- DirecTV
- EchoStar
- Ericsson
- Harmonic

== 2014 Awards ==
The 66th annual Technology & Engineering Emmy Awards were as follows.

Pioneering Development of 2nd Screen Navigable Mosaic for Direct Programmer Offerings to Consumers via the Internet

- HomeBoxOffice (HBO)
- Netflix

Development of Low Latency Video Streaming Live Captioning Systems

- EEG
- XOrbit

Recommended Practice on Techniques for Establishing and Maintaining Audio Loudness for Digital Television

- ATSC (Advanced Television Systems Committee

Television Enhancement Devices

- Apple Inc.
- Roku
- Microsoft
- Sony
- Tivo

Non-Live Large Scale Online Video Systems

- Netflix

Personalized Recommendation Engines for Video Discovery (PREVD) for MVPD's

- Jinni (search engine)
- Think Analytics
- Digital Smiths
- Comcast

Standardization and Productization of JPEG2000 (J2K) Interoperability

- Video Services Forum
- Media Links
- Nevion
- DVBlink, Inc.
- Harris Corporation
- Ericsson
- Artel Video Systems Inc.
- Barco–‐Silex
- intoPIX

Innovation in Improving Engagement Around Television in Social media

- Twitter
- Spredfast (formerly Mass Relevance)

Secure Accelerated File Movement over IP including the Internet

- Aspera an IBM Company
- DataExpedition Inc.
- Signiant
- Unlimitech
- OvO Systems

Pioneering Delivery of Pay TV Linear Video to Consumer Owned and Managed Devices Over a High Speed Data Connection

- Major League Baseball Advanced Media
- Time Warner Cable
- NBC Universal

Multi-format HDTV CCD Camera

- Sony

LDK6000, DPM CCD Multi-format HDTV Camera System

- Philips

High-Definition Multimedia Interface (HDMI)

- Hitachi
- Panasonic (Matsushita Electric)
- Philips
- Silicon Image
- Sony
- Technicolor (Thomson)
- RCA
- Toshiba

High-Bandwidth Digital Content Protection (HDCP)

- Intel

== 2013 Awards ==
Development, Standardization And Productization Of The High Definition Serial Digital Interface

- SMPTE
- SONY
- Yamashita Engineering Manufacture Inc. (FOR-A)

Personalized Recommendation Engines For Video Discovery

- John Hey (Adobe)
- Netflix
- TiVo Inc
- YouTube (Google)
- Amazon

In-Camera Electronic Compensation For Lateral Chromatic Aberrations In External Lenses

- Panasonic

Inexpensive Small Rugged HD Camcorders

- GoPro

Pioneering Wearable Camera Stabilizer Platforms

- Garrett Brown

Pioneering Analog Video Repositioner

- Steven Rutt
- Robert A. Diamond

Gesture Control Systems For Video And Games (Non-Touch Screen)

- Microsoft
- Nintendo of America - Nintendo's North American subsidiary
- SONY

Pioneering Work In Implementation And Deployment Of Network DVR

- Time Warner Cable
- Cablevision
- Thirdspace (Velocix, Alcatel-Lucent)

Pioneering Development Of Video On Demand (VOD) Dynamic Advertising Insertion

- Time Warner Cable
- N2 Broadband - Ericsson Television

Development And Standardization Of The MPEG-2 Transport Stream

- ISO/IEC JTC1/SC29/WG11 Moving Picture Experts Group

== 2012 Awards ==
Eco-system for Real Time Presentation of TV Content to Mobile Devices without the use of Specialized Television Hardware.

- Apple Inc.

The Development and Commercialization of Analog Local Cable Video Ad Insertion.

- Cablevision Systems
- Channelmatic
- HBO
- MTV Networks
- Starnet
- Texscan-MSI, Inc.
- Wegener

The Development and Commercialization of Cable Interconnects for Local Video Ad Insertion

- Time Warner Cable
- NCC Media

The Development and Commercialization for Digital Infrastructure for Local Cable Ad Insertion

- DEC
- Harmonic Inc.
- Motorola
- Cisco
- SeaChange International
- SkyConnect

Pioneering On-Screen Interactive Program Guides.

- Insight (now Rovi Corporation)

Pioneering Development of Event Driven Control Room Automation Systems for Production of Live Television Shows, which Encompasses Full Control of Robotic Cameras, Audio, Graphics and Video Sources.

- Parkervision (Grass Valley)

Pioneering Development and Deployment of Aspect Ratio Control Technologies and Systems For Letterbox Images within Consumer Devices.

- Warner Brothers
- Sam Runco

Development of Electronic Mastering System for Large Scale Content Customization, Transcoding and Distribution.

- Warner Bros
- CBS Worldwide Distribution

Pioneering Development of Multi-Room DVR.

- Time Warner Cable
- Cisco

IRND Filter Technology for Digital Motion Picture Cameras.

- The Tiffen Company
- Schneider Optics Inc.

Improvements to Large Format CMOS Imagers for Use in High Definition Broadcast Video Cameras.

- Arnold & Richter Cine Technik (ARRI)
- Canon USA, INC
- RED Studios
- Sony Electronics

Lifetime Achievement Award

- Manolo Romero, managing director, Olympic Broadcasting Services

== 2011 Awards ==
Local Cable Ad Insertion Technology - Cable Digital Standards for Local Cable Advertising

- SMPTE
- SCTE

The System for Automated Migration of Media Assets

- Samma (Front Porch Digital)

Pioneering Development of Large-Venue, Large-Screen Direct View Color Video Displays

- Mitsubishi Electric Power Products, Inc. - Diamond Vision Systems
- Shuji Nakamura, Professor / University of California - Santa Barbara

Pioneering Development and Deployment of Active Format Description and Aspect Ratio Control Technologies and Systems

- ATSC
- SMPTE
- DTG - Digital TV Group
- DVB
- NBC Universal
- Ericsson - Ericsson Television
- Miranda Technologies
- CEA

Development of Integrated, Deployable Systems for Live Reporting from Remote Environments

- David Bloom
- NBC
- MTN Satellite Communications

Standardization of Loudness Metering for Use in Broadcast Audio

- ITU-R Study Group 6 / International Telecommunication Union (ITU)
- Dolby Laboratories, Inc.
- Communications Research Centre
- Dr. Gilbert Soulodre
- Craig Todd

Development of Professional Tapeless Portable Acquisition Systems Using Affordable Media

- Sony Corporation

Pioneering Development of Removable Solid State Media for Video Camera/Recorders (Camcorders)

- Panasonic Corporation

== 2010 Awards ==
Lifetime Achievement Award in Technology and Engineering

- Sir Howard Stringer, chairman and CEO of Sony Corporation

For Development and Production of Portable Tapeless Acquisition

- Avid Technology, Inc.
- Ikegami Co. LTD

The Belt Pack
Distributed Amplifier Systems in Live Production

- Stan Hubler
- Dough Leighton
- Bob Cohen
- Charlie Butten
- RTS Systems, Inc.
- Clear-Com (HME)

Development of Wireless Intercom

- HME (HM Electronics, Inc.)
- RTS Systems, Inc.

Development of Audio Meta Data Process for conforming audio the ATSC digital TV standard

- Dolby Laboratories, Inc.
- Linear Acoustic, Inc.

Enabling Standards for the delivery of television via broadband data systems

- CableLabs

HD Super Motion Systems for acquisition, recording and Playback for Broadcast Entertainment and Sports Productions

- NAC Image Technology, Inc.
- EVS Broadcast Equipment, Inc.
- Vision Research (An AMETEK® Company)
- Grass Valley Group
- Sony Corporation

Blue Laser Optical Systems for Consumer Playback

- Sony Corporation
- Royal Philips Electronics
- Panasonic Corporation
- TDK Corporation

== 2009 Awards ==
For its Audience Measurement Technology System

- Nielsen Corporation
- Arbitron

For its Pioneering Development in Electronic Prompting

- Portapromt
- COMPU=PROMPT

For its Pioneering Development of MSDC High-Power Amplifiers

- L3

For its Pioneering Efforts in Development, Implementation of Network Distribution workflows for ATSC DTV Development

- FOX (Transmission Operations Center)
- PBS (The Public Broadcasting Service)

For the Development of NTSC Television

- The Federal communications commission (FCC)
- CEA (Radio Manufacturers Association)
- The NTSC

For Pioneering Development of Automatic Transmitter Identification for Satellite Television Communications

- HBO (Home Box Office)
- ELMER MUSSER

== 2008 Awards ==
Lifetime Achievement Award in Technology & Engineering

- Ivan G. Seidenberg, chairman and chief executive officer of Verizon Communications Inc.

Serial Interface and Protocols for Server/VTR control

- Harris Corporation
- Sony

Delivery Confirmation Systems

- XOrbit
- Scripps Networks

Development and Standardization of File Formats for Video and Audio

- Society of Motion Picture and Television Engineers (SMPTE)
- Thomson Grass Valley

Pioneering Development of MPEG-4 AVC systems for HDTV

- Tandberg Television
- DirecTV

Pioneering RF Combiners for Adjacent Channels on Common Antenna Systems

- Harris Corporation
- Micro Communications Inc. (MCI)
- Radio Frequency Systems (RFS)

Ongoing live global HD cinemacasting

- Metropolitan Opera Association

Developing HDMI

- Silicon Image
- Thomson Multimédia
- Toshiba
- Sony
- Matsushita
- Hitachi
- Philips
- Molex
- Japan Aviation Electronics (JAE)
- Intel

Standardization of the ATSC Digital System

- Advisory Committee on Advanced Television Service
- Advanced Television System Committee
- Advanced Television Test Center
- Advanced Television Evaluation Laboratory

MPEG-4 AVC Standard

- Video Coding Experts Group (VCEG)
- Moving Picture Experts Group (MPEG)

== 2007 Awards ==
The Emmy Awards for ATSC broadcast transmission system RF filters:

- Electronics Research Inc.
- Dielectric Communications
- Harris Broadcast
- Micro Communications Inc.

The Emmy Awards for Development... of interactive Video on Demand infrastructure and signaling, leading to large scale VOD implementations:

- Time Warner Cable
- Scientific Atlanta
- N2 Broadband (Tandberg Television)

The Emmy Award for coaxial cable technology:

- AT&T

The Emmy Award for Pioneering development of a fully monitored fiber optic based digital network at shared use sports venues:

- Vyvx Services

The Emmy Award for Development and implementation of an integrated and portable IP-based live, edit and store-and-forward digital news-gathering system:

- CNN

The Emmy Awards for Monitoring for compliance standards for ATSC & DVB transport streams:

- Rohde & Schwarz
- Tektronix
- Thomson
- Pixelmetrix Corporation

The advanced media technology winners for Science, Engineering & Technology for Broadband & Personal Television:

The Awards for Outstanding Achievement in Advanced Media Technology for Best Use of Commercial Advertising on Personal Computer:

- The L Word in Second Life, Showtime Networks/Electric Sheep Company

The Awards for Outstanding Achievement in Advanced Media Technology for Best Use for Creation and Distribution of Interactive Commercial Advertising Delivered Through Digital Set Top Boxes:

- Axe Boost Your E.S.P. Interactive Channel Experience, Brightline iTV/Unilever

The Awards for Outstanding Achievement in Advanced Media Technology for Synchronous Enhancement of Original Television Content for Interactive Use (Two Screen Environment TV /PC or TV / Mobile Device):

- March Madness on Demand, CBSSports.com/CBS Sports

The Awards for Outstanding Achievement in Advanced Media Technology for Creation of Non-Traditional Programs or Platforms:

- MTV's Virtual Laguna Beach, MTV Networks

The Awards for Outstanding Achievement in Advanced Media Technology for Best Use of Personal Media Display and Presentation Technology (PSP, Cell Phone, Personal Media Player, Mobile Devices):

- Bravo To Go, Bravo

The Awards for Outstanding Achievement in Advanced Media Technology for Best Use of "On Demand" (Consumer Scheduled or Programmed) Technology Over Broadband Networks for Active "lean-forward" Viewing:

- MLB Mosaic, Ensequence/MLB.TV

The Awards for Outstanding Achievement in Advanced Media Technology for Best Use of "On Demand" for Passive "lean-backward" Viewing:

- Switched Digital Video: Revolutionizing TV, Time Warner Cable/BigBand Networks

Following are the winners for Engineering & Technology for Creation and Implementation of Video Games and Platforms:

The Awards for Game Controller Innovation:

- Nintendo DS, Nintendo,
- Wii, Nintendo

The Awards for Handheld Game Device Display Screen Innovation:

- Football & Auto Race – Mattel Electronics
- Atari Lynx – Atari Corporation
- Nintendo DS – Nintendo

The Awards for User-Generated Content - Game Modification:

- Pinball Construction Set – Bill Budge & Electronic Arts
- Quake – John Carmack & id Software
- Second Life – Philip Rosedale & Linden Lab

The Award for Physics Engines:

- Havok

The Awards for Development of Massively Multiplayer Online Graphical Role Playing Games (MMORPG):

- Neverwinter Nights – Don Daglow & Stormfront Studios, AOL-Time Warner, Wizards of the Coast,
- EverQuest – Sony Online Entertainment
- World of Warcraft – Mike Morhaime & Blizzard Entertainment

The Awards for Visual Digital Content Creation Tools and their Impact:

- Maya, Autodesk
- 3D Studio Max, Autodesk

SOURCE: National Academy of Television Arts and Sciences

== 2006 Awards ==
Pioneering Development of On Screen Display (OSD) for Setup, Control and Configuration of Consumer Television Equipment

- RCA-TTE

Streaming Media Architectures and Components

- Microsoft (DirectX)
- Adobe Systems Inc.
- RealNetworks
- Apple

Pioneering Development for Combining Multiple Transport Streams Which Are Already Encoded, Using Rate-Shaping and Statistical Re-multiplexing

- Terayon Communication Systems, Inc.

Development and Implementation of Automatically Assembled Dynamic Customized TV Advertising

- Visible World
- The Weather Channel

Technology Advances in Serial Digital Interface Solutions, Enabling Over 20 Years of Seamless Studio and Broadcast Infrastructure Migration

- Gennum Corporation

Privately Owned and Operated International Satellite Company Primarily for International Video Services

- Rene Anselmo, PanAmSat

Advanced Media Technology for the Synchronous Enhancement of Original Television Content

- DirecTV Interactive Sports – DirecTV

Advanced Media Technology for the Non-Synchronous Enhancement of Original Television Content

- The-N.com Video Mixer – The N

Advanced Media Technology for the Creation of Non-Traditional Programs or Platforms

- The Slingbox – Sling Media

Advanced Media Technology for the Best Use of Personal Media Display and Presentation Technology

- Xross Media Bar – Sony Computer Entertainment

Advanced Media Technology for the Best Use of “On Demand” Technology Over Private (closed) Networks

- Time Warner Cable's Start Over – Time Warner Cable
- Concurrent Computer Corp.
- Big Band Networks
- Harmonic Inc.
- Scientific Atlanta.

Advanced Media Technology for the Best Use of “On Demand” Technology Over the Public (open) Internet

- Stim TV – NPOWR

Advanced Media Technology for Best Use by Commercials in Creation and Use in Non Traditional Platforms and Technologies

- TiVo Interactive Advertising Platform – TiVo Inc.

Peripheral Development and Technological Impact of Video Game Controllers

- Nintendo, for the D-pad innovation on the NES/Famicom controller
- Sony Computer Entertainment America, for the Dual Shock Analog Controller.

Development of 3D Software Engines

- John Carmack
- id Software

Pioneering Work in Near and Real-Time Fully Programmable Shading Via Modern Graphics Processors

- Microsoft
- AMD
- NVIDIA Corporation

== 2005 Awards ==
- RCA-TTE, For Pioneering Development of On Screen Display (OSD) for Setup, Control and Configuration of Consumer Television Equipment
- Microsoft, Adobe Systems, RealNetworks, and Apple Computer, Inc., For Streaming Media Architectures and Components
- Terayon Communication Systems, Inc., For pioneering Development for Combining Multiple transport Streams Which Are Already Encoded, Using Rate-Shaping and Statistical Re-multiplexing
- Visible World and The Weather Channel, For Development and Implementation of automatically Assembled Dynamic Customized TV Advertising
- Gennum Corp., For Technology Advances in Serial Digital Interface Solutions, enabling Over 20 Years of Seamless Studio and Broadcast Infrastructure migration.
- The-N.com (a website associated with The N television channel) for Outstanding Achievement in Advanced Media Technology for the Non-Synchronous Enhancement of Original Television Programming, for the Video Masher.

== 2004 Awards ==
- Ampex and ABC, For slow-motion color recording and playback for broadcast
- ABC, PBS, and Consumer Electronics Association, For closed caption standardization
- The WB and IBM, For pioneering development of locally integrated and branded content using IP Store and forward technology
- Canon USA Inc., Fujinon, and Thales Angeniux, For lens technology developments for solid state imagers cameras in high definition formats
- AT&T For the first intercontinental satellite TV transmission.

== 2003 Awards ==
- Sharp, for development of Direct View Liquid Crystal Display Screens
- Philips, for development of UHP Lamps
- Len Reiffel, for pioneering efforts in the invention of the Telestrator
- Echostar and DirecTV for pioneering Efforts in the Development of Spot Beam Satellites for Distribution of Local Broadcast Channels Directly to Home Receivers
- nCUBE, Concurrent, and SeaChange, for development, productization, and commercialization of video server technology leading to large-scale VOD implementations

== 2002 Awards ==
- Turner Networks For Pioneering Efforts in the Development of Automated, Server-Based Closed Captioning Systems. Development was performed by XOrbit, also awarded.
- Thales Broadcast & Multimedia For Pioneering Development of Digital Modulator Adaptive Pre-Correction for ATSC 8VSB Digital Transmitter Systems
- Thomson Broadcast & Media Solutions For Development And Application Of Sub-Pixel Imaging Devices For Television Cameras
- Dolby Laboratories, Jim Fosgate, and Peter Scheiber For Development of Surround Sound for Television
- Texas Instruments DLP Products For Pioneering Development of mass-produced digital reflective imaging technology for consumer rear projection television
- Dr. Kees Immink For Coding Technology for Optical Recording Formats
- Pinnacle Systems (Montage) and Thomson Broadcast & Media Solutions For Technology to simultaneously encode multiple video qualities and the corresponding metadata
- CBS Technology Center and Society of Motion Picture and Television Engineers (SMPTE) for their improved SMPTE color bars standard ECR 1-1978

== 2001 Awards ==
- Plasma display by Donald Bitzer. This revolutionized the television.
- Final Cut Pro by Apple Inc. A one application, any format editing system.
- Boujou Automated Camera Tracker by 2d3 Ltd. This innovation provides automatic shot tracking in a fraction of the usual time.
- Arriflex Cameras by ARRI Inc. A Lifetime Achievement Award goes to this organization for fifty years of technological contributions to the industry.
- TM Systems, for their language translation, dubbing and subtitling system.
- Proximity Corporation for software for managing graphical assets for broadcast.

== 2000 Awards ==
- Digital upconverter by BBC, Faroudja, Leitch and YEM.
- Personal video recorder by TiVo and Replay.
- SFQ transmitter by Rohde & Schwarz.
- Consumer camcorders by Sony, JVC, Hitachi, Matsushita and Kodak.
- 24p by Sony, LaserPacific and Kodak.
- Flat-screen CRT by Sony and Zenith.
- Shared video-data-storage system by Leitch/ASC, SeaChange, Thomson/Philips and Pinnacle.
- Digital asset management for television news by KGO-TV, CNN, ITN and Quantel.
- Millennium XL Film Camera System by Panavision.

== 1960 Presentation ==
Radio Corporation of America, Marconi's Wireless Telegraph Company and English Electric Valve Company for the independent development of the 4 1/2 inch image orthicon tube and camera.

== See also ==
- Academy Scientific and Technical Award
- List of American television awards
- List of engineering awards
