= Harmonic Inc. =

American technology company

- Type: Public
- Traded as: Nasdaq: HLIT; S&P 600 Component
- Industry: Telecommunications
- Headquarters: San Jose, California, U.S.
- Key people: Nimrod Ben-Natan, president and chief executive officer
- Products: Video servers and storage, broadcast and multiscreen encoders and transcoders, contribution encoders, stream processors, integrated receiver-decoders, media asset management
- Revenue: $608 million (2023)
- Number of employees: 1700 (2024)
- Website: www.harmonicinc.com

Harmonic Inc. is an American technology company that develops and markets video routing, server, and storage products for companies that produce, process, and distribute video content for television and the Internet.

== History ==
Harmonic was initially incorporated in California in June 1988 as Harmonic Lightwaves, and reincorporated into Delaware in May 1995. Anthony J. Ley became chief executive in November 1988 after the creation of the company by co-founders Moshe Nazarathy, and Josef Berger. Co-founder Moshe Nazarathy led a research and development center named "Harmonic Data" in Israel starting in 1993, funded in part by the Israel-U.S. Binational Industrial Research and Development Foundation.

Harmonic acquired the DiviCom business of C-Cube Microsystems in 2000 for about $1.7 billion in stock. It acquired the video networking software business of Entone Technologies in 2006 for about $45 million, Rhozet Corporation in 2007, and Scopus Video Networks, Ltd. in 2009, for $5.62 per share in cash, which represents an enterprise value of approximately $50 million, net of Scopus’ cash and short-term investments.

Omneon Video Networks was founded in May 1998, with investors including Advanced Technology Ventures, Norwest Venture Partners, Accel Partners and Invesco. Omneon co-founder Donald M. Craig designed products that won Technology & Engineering Emmy Awards in 1988 and 1996. On December 29, 2006 Omneon filed for an initial public offering, and tried again several times in 2007 and 2008 after dropping the "Video Networks" from its name, but remained private. On May 6, 2010 Omneon announced it agreed to be acquired by Harmonic for an estimated $274 million.

Harmonic sold its line of fiber-optic access products to Aurora Networks in February 2013 for $46 million in cash.

On February 29, 2016 Harmonic acquired Thomson Video Networks.

In January 2022, SBTVD Forum approved a selection of technologies for SBTVD 3.0 which include MPEG-5 LCEVC, V-NOVA & Harmonic’s submission.

In December 2025, it was announced Harmonic had received a binding offer from the Denver, CO-headquartered video technology company, MediaKind to acquire its video business segment for approximately $145 million in cash.

Harmonic completed the video business divestiture in June 2026. MediaKind acquired the video business segment for approximately $145 million in cash. The transaction positions Harmonic as a pure-play broadband tech company.

== Products ==
Harmonic’s products fall into four principal categories:

- video production products,
- video server products for channel playout,
- video processing products, and
- cable edge products.

Video production products are used to support video editing, post-production and finishing. Server systems are used to assemble and play out one or more channel systems. Video processing products are used by media companies, broadcasters, telcos, satellite operators, cable operators, and OTT operators to acquire and use different types and sources of video signals. Cable edge products are used by cable operators to deliver customized broadcast or on-demand and data services to their subscribers.

The company supplies cable television headend or hub devices that receive digital video or data from the operator network, re-packetizes the video or data into an MPEG transport stream, then digitally modulates the MPEG transport stream onto a downstream RF channel using quadrature amplitude modulation (QAM).

== Market ==
Harmonic sells its products to cable, satellite and telco, and broadcast and media companies.

In 2012, United States customers included Cablevision Systems, CenturyLink, Charter Communications, Comcast Corporation, Cox Communications, DirecTV, EchoStar Holding, TRC Integration, Time Warner Cable, and Turner Broadcasting.

Customers outside the United States include Alcatel-Lucent, Bell Satellite TV, Capella Telecommunications, Globecast, Huawei Technologies, Klonex – VCS, Netorium, Rogers Communications, SKY Perfect JSAT Corporation, Virgin Media, and Ziggo.

== Competitors ==
Harmonic’s video infrastructure competitors include vertically integrated system suppliers, such as Motorola, Cisco Systems, and, in certain product lines, a number of smaller companies, including Envivio, RGB Networks (now Imagine Communications), Elemental Technologies and Appear TV and ATEME. In production and playout products, competitors include Harris (now Imagine Communications), Grass Valley, Miranda and Avid Technology. In edge devices, competitors include Motorola Mobility (acquired by Google in 2012), Cisco Systems, and Arris International. In late July 2017, Harmonic completed the acquisition of Thomson Video Networks that used to be one of its leading competitors in Europe and APAC.
