= Thomson Broadcast =

French Electronics Manufacturer

Thomson Broadcast - Phenixya
- Type: Private
- Industry: Broadcasting, media
- Predecessor: Arelis Broadcast
- Headquarters: Paris, France
- Key people: Ylias Akbaraly (President)
- Products: Television and radio transmission systems, microwave links, head-ends, local and remote network management systems
- Number of employees: 37 ( 2025 )
- Website: thomsonbroadcast.tv

Thomson Broadcast is a French company operating as Phenixya, that specializes in the deployment and servicing of television and medium-wave radio transmission systems.

== History ==
=== Early development ===
Thomson Broadcast is a legacy of the former Thomson Group, which first transmitted television programs on July 10, 1937 from the Eiffel Tower. Thomson Group led to the creation of two companies in 1995: Thomson-CSF, specializing in defense and Thomson Multimedia (TMM), specializing in electronic consumer goods. Thomson Multimedia acquired the DVD manufacturer Technicolor and Grass Valley, a company focusing on cameras and video technology, in 2000 and 2001. This reinforced a strategy to produce and sell professional equipment (instead of consumer goods) which was fully implemented in 2005, when Thomson acquired Thales Broadcast & Multimedia.

From 2000 to 2008, Thomson/Thales Broadcast & Multimedia reinforced its position in transmission deployment. In 2000, Thales Multimedia introduced two one-megawatt longwave transmitters in Roumoules, France, to broadcast Radio Monte Carlo from Great Britain to North Africa. In 2008, the National Academy of Television Arts and Sciences (NATAS) gave a Technology and Engineering Emmy Award for outstanding achievement in technical or engineering development in the "Monitoring for compliance standards for ATSC & DVB transport streams" category to Thomson, Pixelmetrix, Tektronix and Rohde & Schwarz. That year, All India Radio ordered a one-megawatt S7HP medium-wave transmitter from Thomson.

In 2009, Thomson experienced serious financial difficulty. Thomson announced that it is selling the Thomson Grass Valley equipment business to private investors led by PARTER Capital Group, a German private equity advisory firm.

In 2010, Thomson was renamed Technicolor (now Vantiva SA), while retaining ownership of the Thomson associated brands, which it licenses through contractual agreements.

=== Global expansion ===
The Arelis Group took over Thomson Broadcast's activities through a new subsidiary, Arelis Broadcast. It also acquired a commercial license to use the Thomson Broadcast name. In December 2012, Arelis Group acquired Thomson Broadcast's transmission portfolio, including its radio and television transmitter lines. Arelis Broadcast received a contract to deploy next stage transmission DTT (digital terrestrial television) transmitters to Israel. By 2013, its asset turnover was said to have increased by 20 percent; this growth led to a global increase of 440 percent from 2012 to 2015. The Cape Verde digital transition was achieved with a Arelis Broadcast transmission turnkey system in 2015, and the company competed in other African projects against the Chinese media company StarTimes. Proposing DTT system and medium-wave radio transmission systems around the world, Thomson Broadcast is involved in Digital Video Broadcasting and Digital Radio Mondiale.

In August 2018, following the judicial liquidation of Arelis Broadcast, Thales SIX GTS France acquired its military activities, including the Radio division. The business assets were purchased on August 1, 2018, for €1 million, along with the transfer of 28 employees' contracts.

In August 2018, Groupe Sipromad, led by Ylias Akbaraly, acquired part of Arelis Broadcast, including its television and civil radio division, for €60,000. To manage these activities, Sipromad created Phenixya, which took over the operations of Thomson Broadcast. As part of this transition, Phenixya ensured the execution of ongoing contracts, including the TNT network deployment in Mali, initially won by Arelis Broadcast.

The company is majority-owned by Phenixya Holdings France, alongside Groupe Sipromad SA and Redland.

In April 2022, Phenixya - Thomson Broadcast began the process of acquiring GatesAir. The acquisition was closed in August 2022.. In October 2025, GatesAir was acquired by Saothair Capital Partners, returning the company to U.S.-based ownership.

== Products ==
Products manufactured by Thomson Broadcast include:

- Radio and television transmission systems
- Gigativy high-power television transmitters
- Megativy II medium-power television transmitters
- Dreamline low-power television transmitters
- S7HP Neo medium-wave radio transmitters
- RF passive components
