= V-NOVA =

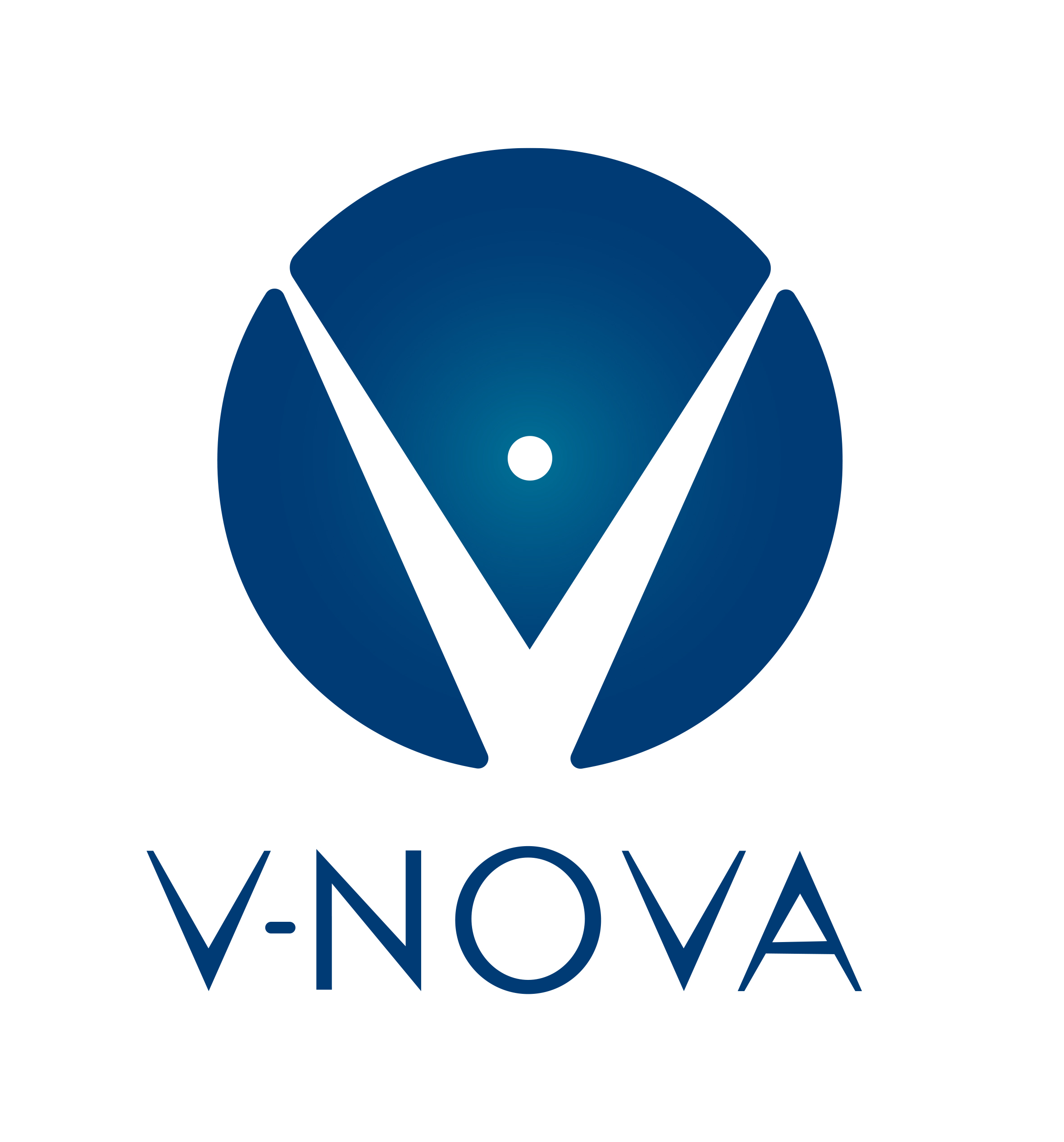
- Type: Private limited company
- Industry: Data compression, video codec, virtual and augmented reality,
- Founded: 2011
- Founders: Guido Meardi, Pierdavide Marcolongo and Others
- Headquarters: London, UK
- Area served: Worldwide
- Key people: David Benello (Chairman); Guido Meardi (Chief Executive Officer); Pierdavide Marcolongo (Chief operating officer)

V-NOVA is a multinational IP and Technology company headquartered in London, UK. It is best known for innovation in data compression technology for video and images. V-Nova has partnered with large organizations including Sky, Xilinx, Nvidia, Eutelsat, and Amazon Web Services to provide its video compression technology.

== History ==
=== 2011–2012: Founding ===
V-Nova was founded in London in 2011 by Guido Meardi and Pierdavide Marcolongo. In 2012, inventor Federico Faggin joined as an investor and founding member, strengthening the company’s technical and commercial footing.

=== 2016: Industry backing and live validation ===
In 2016, Sky acquired a minority stake; Eutelsat later invested. Eutelsat used V-Nova technology for 4K contribution during UEFA Euro 2016, providing early large-scale validation. Sky Italia deployed an IPTV system using V-Nova technology. V-Nova also joined the Society of Motion Picture and Television Engineers (SMPTE).

=== 2017: IP expansion ===
The company acquired the Faroudja patent portfolio, expanding the intellectual-property base behind its technologies.

=== 2019–2021: Standardization and verification ===
In 2019, V-Nova contributions were selected by MPEG for what became MPEG-5 Part 2, Low Complexity Enhancement Video Coding (LCEVC), and the company joined the Advanced Television Systems Committee (ATSC). In 2021, MPEG completed the LCEVC specification, as well as verification testing that confirmed the benefits of applying LCEVC to codecs such as AVC, HEVC, EVC, and VVC.

=== 2020–2021: Partnerships and funding ===
V-Nova collaborated with Amazon Web Services in 2020 to support more efficient online video services. In 2021, it partnered with SOUTHWORKS on LCEVC integration and worked with D-Orbit and Unibap to demonstrate SMPTE VC-6 acceleration for on-orbit satellite imagery. That year the company raised €33 million from investors including Neva SGR.

=== 2022: Brazil TV 3.0 selection ===
Brazil’s SBTVD Forum selected technologies for the TV 3.0 initiative that included MPEG-5 LCEVC, enabling national-scale trials and showcases.

=== 2023-2024: Immersive media expansion ===
V-Nova acquired Parallaxter SRL, developer of the PresenZ XR point-cloud format, extending the portfolio into Six Degrees of Freedom (6DoF) cinematic experiences and point cloud compression. V-Nova also launched a Studio division in 2024 and released on Steam the ImmersiX multi-content app, focused on delivering 6DoF cinematic experiences using the V-Nova PresenZ format.

=== 2025: Licensing and TV3.0/DTV+ first broadcast and ratification ===
The company contributed HEVC IP to the Access Advance HEVC patent pool. As of August 2025, V-Nova continues to develop and license standards-based IP and software around MPEG-5 LCEVC, SMPTE VC-6, and V-Nova PresenZ.

On 29 April 2025, TV Globo launched Brazil’s first experimental DTV+ (TV 3.0) broadcast in Rio de Janeiro using a temporary license from the Ministry of Communications and Anatel. The transmission originated from Pico do Sumaré and reached parts of the South Zone and Barra da Tijuca. It carried two services in one six‑megahertz channel with one at 1080p using VVC at six megabits per second and another at 2160p UHD using MPEG‑5 LCEVC and VVC at ten megabits per second, with immersive audio in MPEG‑H format both decoded on real TVs and set‑top boxes.

On 27 August 2025, President Luiz Inácio Lula da Silva together with the Minister of Communications signed the decree formalizing the adoption of the TV 3.0 DTV+ standard, which includes MPEG-5 LCEVC and VVC, into Brazilian law at the Palácio do Planalto. The decree sets the regulatory foundation for next generation broadcast television. Brazil became the first country in Latin America and the BRICS to adopt this standard.

In August 2025, V-Nova rolled out two licensing programs for MPEG-5 LCEVC, with terms crafted for both video distribution services and consumer device makers. Public reporting indicates the service program bases royalties on active user counts (with a waiver for free-to-air broadcasting), while the device program starts at about US $0.20 per unit (and includes discounts for open-access configurations).

== Technology ==
In 2015, the company announced a new digital data-encoding technology based on multi-layer coding, parallel processing and deep learning called Perseus for efficient video streaming with a focus on enabling UHD/4K services at lower bandwidths. It was claimed that it could be streamed to TVs and other devices using only around 50% of the bandwidth required by existing streaming technologies.

V-Nova's technology was later selected to provide the essential intellectual property for the ISO/IEC 23094-2 standard MPEG-5 Part 2 Low Complexity Enhancement Video Coding (LCEVC). LCEVC is a codec-agnostic standard developed to meet the growing demands of video delivery at higher resolutions and within constrained bandwidth and compute environments. It is designed to work alongside existing codecs, preserving compatibility with their established device ecosystems.

V-NOVA also developed another international standard codec, SMPTE VC-6 ST 2117, aimed at professional video and Artificial Intelligence applications.

In April 2021, MPEG Video validated the Verification Test of LCEVC (Low Complexity Enhancement Video Coding) standard (ISO/IEC 23094-2). Test results tended to indicate an overall benefit also when using LCEVC to enhance AVC, HEVC, EVC and VVC.

== Awards ==
The CSI Awards recognized V-NOVA as Best Digital Video Processing Technology in 2015 and 2017. V-NOVA was named Best of Show by the TV Technology Awards for four consecutive years in 2015, 2016, 2017, & 2018. It was also named Best of Show for its PERSEUS-powered Universal Media Player by TVB Europe in 2015, 2016, and 2017.

In 2016, the Diplomatic Council Awards named V-NOVA as Global Media Innovator. V-NOVA was recognized for its point cloud compression scheme by the Advanced Image Society at the 12th annual Entertainment Technology Lumiere Awards in 2022.
