= Chips&Media =

Intellectual property provider

Chips&Media, Inc.
- Company type: Public
- Traded as: KOSDAQ:094360
- Industry: Semiconductor IP
- Founded: March 2003
- Headquarters: Seoul, Korea
- Products: UHD (4K) Video Encoder & Decoder IP Core : WAVE, Video Encoder & Decoder IP Core : CODA, Video Decoder IP Core : BODA, Image Signal Processing IP : CARPO/LEDA/METIS, Computational Photography IP NIX/HYDRA/KERBEROS, Object Detection IP : c.WAVE100
- Revenue: KRW 14.1 billion (2018)
- Operating income: ▲KRW 2.0 billion (2018)
- Net income: ▲KRW 2.6 billion (2018)
- Website: www.chipsnmedia.com

Chips&Media, Inc. is a Korean provider of intellectual property for integrated circuits (commonly called "chips") such as system on a chip technology for encoding and decoding video (video codecs), and image processing.

== Products ==
Since 2003, the company has developed video technology. Its video semiconductor intellectual property cores (IP cores) cover video coding formats such as MPEG-2, MPEG-4, H.263, H.264/AVC, VC-1, RealVideo, AVS, MVC, VP8, AVS, AVS2, HEVC(H.265) and VP9. Their technologies are used by licensees including Freescale, VIA, Realtek and Novatek Innofidei, and Telechips.

The company announced an image processing products in 2016 and 2017, and reportedly signed first license deal in March 2018.

In 2018, Chips&Media added object detection IP to its product line up.

=== WAVE ===
WAVE is multi-standard encoder and decoder system specifically designed for ultra-high-definition(4K) resolution up to 60 frame per second. WAVE codec (encoder & decoder) supports HEVC(H.265) and H.264/AVC, while decodes formats including HEVC(H.265), H.264/AVC, VP9, AV1 and AV2.

=== CODA ===
CODA video cores are multi-standard video engines that encode and decode, with support for simultaneous multiple channel or format, suited to mobile handsets, digital camcorders, home multimedia devices, video conferencing, and video surveillance. CODA supports 2K resolution at up to 60 frames per second. The main distinguishing points compared to WAVE is CODA's inability to encode and decode HEVC(H.265) and its 2K vs 4K.

=== BODA ===
BODA video cores decode formats that include H.264/AVC, VC-1, MVC, VP8, H.263, MPEG-4, MPEG-2, RealVideo, and AVS with support in resolutions from D1 through to Full HD (1080p). Among them is the first fully hardware decoder for VP8 that can decode Full HD resolution VP8 streams at 60 frames per second.

=== Carpo/Leda/Metis ===
CARPO, LEDA, and METIS are image signal processing(ISP) tools that provide configurable ISP pipelines that support resolutions up to 2MP, 5MP, and above 5MP respectively. These are basic ISP pipelines that can be complemented by NIX, HYDRA, or KERBEROS.

=== NIX ===
NIX is a multi-exposure HDR (wide dynamic range) design. NIX supports the fusion of two exposures with a line-interleaved method.

=== HYDRA ===
HYDRA is a three dimensional noise reduction (3DNR) system that removes image noises by using multiple image frames. It uses a motion adaptive method.

=== KERBEROS ===
KERBEROS is a lens distortion correction method that corrects or flattens images distorted by wide-angled lenses.

=== c.WAVE100 ===
c.WAVE100 is computer vision IP, detecting objects (e.g. car, person, cyclist) with a capability to process 4K resolution at 30fps video input in real-time. The IP implements Convolution Neural Network (CNN) algorithm for object detection and is differentiated by introducing fully hardwired and dedicated architecture to significantly reduce memory bandwidth requirements. These characteristics make the fixed function IP suitable for computing intensive edge devices in automotive and surveillance applications.
