= Ateme =

Video compression company

Ateme S.A.
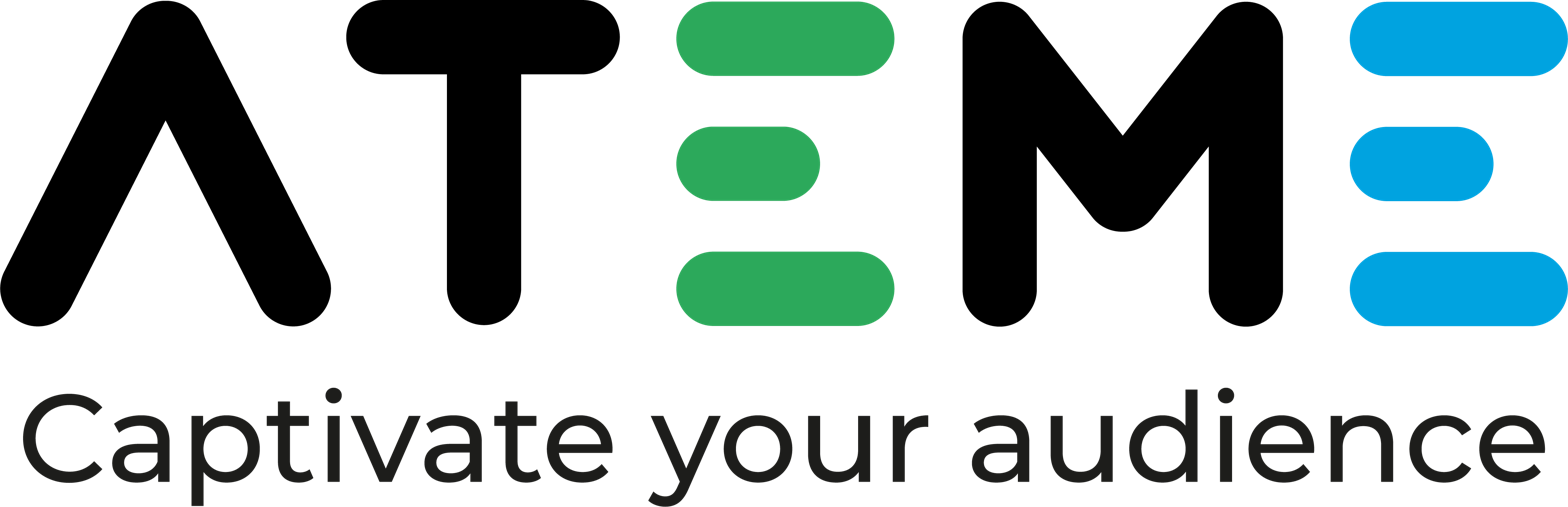
- Type: Public
- Traded as: Euronext: ATEME; CAC All-Share
- ISIN: FR0011992700
- Industry: Broadcast
- Founded: 1991; 35 years ago
- Founder: Michel Artières, Dominique Edelin
- Headquarters: Vélizy, near Paris, France
- Area served: Worldwide
- Products: Video compression, TITAN, KYRION, NEA, PILOT, Ateme +
- Number of employees: 110 in 2013. 310 in 2020. 500 in 2021. 540 in 2022. 580 in 2024.
- Website: www.ateme.com

Ateme S.A. is a multinational company that specializes in video compression, content delivery networks (CDN) and streaming, cloud recording, and advertising. It develops video compression software based on several industry standards, including MPEG2, H.264/AVC, H.265/HEVC, AV1, and H.266/VVC (Versatile Video Coding). Ateme's products include packaging capabilities with MPEG2-TS, HLS, and DASH outputs. These solutions are used by content providers, broadcasters, multichannel video programming distributors, and streaming providers for delivery.

The company is headquartered in Vélizy, near Paris, France, and operates additional offices across Europe, North America, South America, Asia, and Australia.

== History ==
Ateme has been listed on the Paris Euronext market since 2014 and in November 2020 it acquired Anevia, a provider of OTT and IPTV software solutions. In 2023, Ateme earned €100 million in revenues, of which more than 90% outside its home market.

== Technology adoption ==
In 2026, Netflix signed a multi-year agreement to deploy Ateme's TITAN Live transcoder for its live streaming workflows.

== Awards ==
Ateme won the 2022 Technology and Engineering Emmy Awards by The National Academy of Television Arts & Sciences (NATAS).
