= On the fly =

Change to a system while the process it affects is ongoing

"On the fly" is a phrase used to describe something that is being changed while the process that the change affects is ongoing. It is used in the automotive, computer, and culinary industries. In cars, on the fly can be used to describe the changing of the cars configuration while it is still driving. Processes that can occur while the car is still driving include switching between two wheel drive and four wheel drive on some cars and opening and closing the roof on some convertible cars. In computing, on the fly CD writers can read from one CD and write the data to another without saving it on a computer's memory. Switching programs or applications on the fly in multi-tasking operating systems means the ability to switch between native and/or emulated programs or applications that are still running and running in parallel while performing their tasks or processes, but without pausing, freezing, or delaying any, or other unwanted events. Switching computer parts on the fly means computer parts are replaced while the computer is still running. It can also be used in programming to describe changing a program while it is still running. In restaurants and other places involved in the preparation of food, the term is used to indicate that an order needs to be made right away.

== Colloquial usage ==
In colloquial use, "on the fly" means something created when needed. The phrase is used to mean:

1. something that was not planned ahead
2. changes that are made during the execution of same activity: ex tempore, impromptu.

== Automotive usage ==
In the automotive industry, the term refers to the circumstance of performing certain operations while a vehicle is driven by the engine and moving. In reference to four-wheel drive vehicles, this term describes the ability to change from two to four-wheel drive while the car is in gear and moving. In some convertible models, the roof can be folded electrically on the fly, whereas in other cases the car must be stopped. In harvesting machines, newer monitoring systems let the driver track the quality of the grain, while enabling them to adjust the rotor speed on the fly as harvesting progresses.

== Computer usage ==
In multitasking computing an operating system can handle several programs, both native applications or emulated software, that are running independent, parallel, together in the same time in the same device, using separated or shared resources and/or data, executing their tasks separately or together, while a user can switch on the fly between them or groups of them to use obtained effects or supervise purposes, without waste of time or waste of performance. In operating systems using GUI very often it is done by switching from an active window (or an object playing similar role) of a particular software piece to another one but of another software.

A computer can compute results on the fly, or retrieve a previously stored result.

It can mean to make a copy of a removable media (CD-ROM, DVD, etc.) directly, without first saving the source on an intermediate medium (a harddisk); for example, copying a CD-ROM from a CD-ROM drive to a CD-Writer drive. The copy process requires each block of data to be retrieved and immediately written to the destination, so that there is room in the working memory to retrieve the next block of data.

When used for encrypted data storage, on the fly the data stream is automatically encrypted as it is written and decrypted when read back again, transparently to software. The acronym OTFE is typically used.

On-the-fly programming is the technique of modifying a program without stopping it.

A similar concept, hot swapping, refers to on-the-fly replacement of computer hardware.

== On-the-fly computing ==
On-the-fly computing (OTF computing) is about automating and customizing software tailored to the needs of a user. According to a requirement specification, this software is composed of basic components, so-called basic services, and a user-specific setting of these basic components is made. Accordingly, the requested services are compiled only at the request of the user and then run in a specially designed data center to make the user the functions of the (on-the-fly) created service accessible.

== Restaurant usage ==
In restaurants, cafes, banquet halls, and other places involved in the preparation of food, the term is used to indicate that an order needs to be made right away. This is often because a previously served dish is inedible, because a waiter has made a mistake or delayed, or because a guest has to leave promptly.

== Usage in sports ==
In ice hockey, it is both legal and common for teams to make line changes (player substitutions) when the puck is in play. Such line changes are referred to as being done "on the fly".
