= ShadowTV =

ShadowTV Inc.
- Type: Private
- Industry: Digital Media Services
- Founded: 2001
- Headquarters: New York City, USA
- Key people: Joachim Kim, CEO
- Number of employees: ~20
- Website: www.shadowtv.com

ShadowTV, founded in 2001, provides all-digital continuous-access to live and archived television content via the web. ShadowTV operates two divisions: ShadowTV Monitoring, and ShadowMedia.

In 2008, the Republican National Convention and Democratic National Convention named ShadowTV as their official monitoring service.

In 2009, Cengage announced it would use video from ShadowTV's seven-year archive to supplement its current archive of news broadcasts.
