= XOrbit =

American closed captioning company

XOrbit, Inc.
- Company type: Private
- Industry: Closed captioning Delivery Verification
- Founded: April 10, 1996
- Headquarters: Columbia, MD, USA
- Key people: Steven Blumenschein Founder/President
- Website: xorbit.com

XOrbit, Inc., a privately held organization, claims to strive toward improving the quality of closed caption technologies for the hearing impaired, a U.S. Federal Communications Commission (FCC) requirement for broadcasters.

XOrbit develops and promotes products that purportedly eases the improvement and quality of closed captioning services for broadcast and cable television channels at a lower cost than traditional techniques. For example, they provide a product that prevents broadcasters from having to re-encode line21 captioning information into media whenever a change to the captioning is made. They also provide a product that allows stenographers to send captioning for a live event without requiring a satellite feed for the audio/video content (using TCP/IP technologies).

In 2003, Turner Entertainment gained a Technology & Engineering Emmy Award for XOrbit's closed caption server technology. In 2009, XOrbit was awarded a National Academy of Television Arts and Sciences Technology & Engineering Emmy Award for Real-Time Delivery Confirmation Systems, a service to ensure that content (such as television commercials contracted by a network, or regular network programming) reaches the end viewer as transmitted. In 2015, XOrbit earned another Technology & Engineering Emmy Award for its low latency video captioning encoder.
