= GatesAir =

American radio and TV broadcast transmission equipment company

GatesAir, Inc.
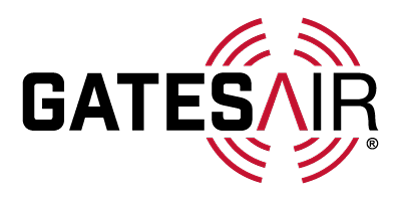
- Formerly: Harris Broadcast, Harris Corporation, Gates Radio Company, Gates Radio & Supply Company
- Type: Subsidiary
- Industry: Broadcasting
- Founded: 1922; 104 years ago
- Founders: Henry C. Gates; Cora B. Gates; Parker S. Gates
- Headquarters: Mason, Ohio / Quincy, Illinois, United States
- Products: AM, FM, UHF, VHF broadcast transmitters; STL transport systems/codecs; video stream monitoring systems; broadcast accessories
- Brands: Maxiva, Flexiva, Intraplex
- Parent: Saothair Capital Partners LLC
- Website: www.gatesair.com

GatesAir is an American electronics manufacturer that produces, markets and services terrestrial TV and radio broadcast equipment globally.

== Products and services ==
GatesAir manufactures transmitters and associated broadcast gear for over-the-air television and radio broadcasting around the world. GatesAir's PowerSmart Plus technology won an award in 2016 for providing the highest power efficiency possible for UHF ATSC transmission.

GatesAir also manufactures audio systems for public safety and government communications, and studio-to-transmitter links for radio broadcasters.

In May 2018, GatesAir launched the website GatesAir University (see External Links), an online library of training webinars and other educational videos centered around broadcast RF engineering.

== Locations ==
Research and development is driven from the company's headquarter facilities in Mason, Ohio and supported by the long-standing manufacturing center in Quincy, Illinois. The Quincy facilities reside on a 40-acre (16.19 hectare) campus that houses GatesAir's manufacturing, integration, test and global fulfillment operations. The Quincy location is also home to the Customer Service and Training Centers. The site is one of the world's largest producers of terrestrial broadcast equipment and technology.

== History ==
GatesAir traces its origins to 1922 when the Gates Radio Company was founded by Parker Gates, with the help of his parents, in Quincy, Illinois. The company was sold in 1957 to Harris Intertype Corporation. The Gates brand was initially retained. In celebrating Gates' 50th anniversary in 1972, it was announced that the company was expanding to add television broadcast equipment with the acquisition of General Electric's TV equipment line that year. The company's name was changed to Harris in 1975. Harris Corporation sold its broadcast equipment operations to the Gores Group in 2012 with the sale completed in 2013.

In March 2014, Harris Broadcast was split into two companies, Imagine Communications and GatesAir. The GatesAir name restores the company's historic name.

In 2016, GatesAir played a crucial role in the deployment of the world's first ATSC 3.0 digital TV broadcasts in South Korea, marking a significant milestone in the transition to Next-Gen TV that are used for showing latest news, vedio etc on the web.

In February 2017, GatesAir sold its radio studio consoles, studio networking, and studio furniture business (collectively known by its brand "Pacific Research & Engineering" or "PR&E") to Wheatstone Corporation. Harris Corporation had acquired PR&E in 1999 and incorporated it into its Broadcast Division.

In May 2019, GatesAir announced its acquisition of ONEtastic, a television transmitter manufacturer based in Brescia, Italy. Using the same staff and facilities, the entity continues operations as GatesAir S.r.l., adding its products to GatesAir's portfolio of offerings.

In April 2022, Thomson Broadcast announced its acquisition of GatesAir; the transaction closed four months later. In October 2025, however, it was reported that private equity firm Saothair Capital Partners LLC had completed its acquisition of the electronics company.
