= Layered coding =

Type of data compression for digital video or audio

Layered coding is a type of data compression for digital video or digital audio where the result of compressing the source video data is not just one compressed data stream, as in other types of compression, but multiple streams, called layers, allowing decompression even if some layers are missing.

== Overview ==
With layered coding, multiple data streams or layers are created when compressing the original video stream. This is in contrast to other types of compression, where the result is typically a single data stream.

During decompression, all layers can be combined to recreate the original video stream. Additionally, the stream can be decoded even if some layers are missing (though usually a layer hierarchy has to be respected, with a base layer that must be available). If layers are missing, the resulting stream will have reduced visual quality, but will still be usable.

== Use cases ==
Layered coding is helpful when the same video stream needs to be available in different qualities, for example for adaptive bitrate streaming. Without layered coding, the source video stream must be encoded multiple times to obtain compressed streams with different qualities and bitrates. Layered coding allows only encoding a single time, because streams with different qualities can be obtained by discarding layers.

== Related technologies ==
Layered coding is similar to multiple description coding in that both produce multiple compressed streams that can be combined. However, with multiple description coding the different streams are independent of each other, so any subset can be decoded, providing additional flexibility.

Scalable Video Coding is a video compression standard that makes use of layered coding.

== See also ==
- MPEG-5 Part 2 / Low Complexity Enhancement Video Coding / LC EVC - technique of similar approach
- Scalable Video Coding - MPEG-4 specific technique of similar approach
- Bitrate peeling
- Hierarchical modulation
- AV1 Scalable video coding
- HEVC Scalability Extensions
- HoangVan, Xiem; NguyenQuang, Sang; Pereira, Fernando (2020). "Versatile Video Coding Based Quality Scalability With Joint Layer Reference" (PDF). IEEE Signal Processing Letters. 27: 2079–2083. Bibcode:2020ISPL...27.2079H. doi:10.1109/LSP.2020.3039729. S2CID 228091515. Archived from the original on December 14, 2021.
- Lin, Wei-Ting; Liu, Zoe; Mukherjee, Debargha; Han, Jingning; Wilkins, Paul; Xu, Yaowu; Rose, Kenneth (March 2018). "Efficient AV1 Video Coding Using a Multi-layer Framework" (PDF). 2018 Data Compression Conference. pp. 365–373. doi:10.1109/DCC.2018.00045. ISBN 978-1-5386-4883-4. S2CID 50771252.
