= Terrestrial broadcast =

Terrestrial broadcast can refer to:

- Terrestrial television
- Terrestrial radio
