= Japan Aviation Electronics =

Japanese electrical connector company

Japan Aviation Electronics Industry, Ltd. (JAE)
- Industry: Electronics
- Founded: 1953
- Founder: Minoru Numoto
- Headquarters: Shibuya, Tokyo, Japan
- Products: Electrical connectors, User interface solutions, Aerospace Equipment
- Owner: NEC 24%
- Number of employees: 9,436
- Subsidiaries: JAE Electronics, Inc., JAE Oregon Inc., JAE Europe, Ltd.
- Website: https://www.jae.com/en/

Japan Aviation Electronics Industry, Ltd. (日本航空電子工業, Nihon Kōkū Denshi Kōgyō) is a Japanese corporation specializing in the manufacture and sales of electrical connectors such as high speed LVDS, HDMI, PCI express, high density, micro coaxial, automotive, and board to board connectors. It also makes systems equipment and aerospace products. With headquarters in Shibuya, Tokyo, JAE is listed on the first section of the Tokyo Stock Exchange (TYO: 6807). The company has a capital of 10.69 billion yen and had net sales of 222.1 billion yen (consolidated) from April 1, 2018 to the year ended March 31, 2019.

A major Japanese defense contractor, Japan Aviation Electronics was convicted of illegally selling sensitive U.S. military technology to Iran in 1992, was fined and stripped of the use of U.S. export licenses for up to three years.

== Establishment ==
AUG.1953	Commenced business with the head office in Minato-ku, Tokyo (in Nippon Electric Co., Ltd.)
AUG.1954	Factory built in Kawasaki-shi, Kanagawa-ken (at location of NEC's Tamagawa Plant)
APR.1961	Akishima Factory (present Akishima Plant) completed, all facilities moved from NEC's Tamagawa Plant
MAY 1961	Head Office moved to Shibuya-ku, Tokyo

== Awards ==
JAN. 2009 JAE among with other nine companies were given a Technology and Engineering Emmy Award for their development of HDMI by the National Academy of Television Arts and Sciences (NATAS) on January 7, 2009.

MAR. 2009 JAE was awarded "Medal with Dark Blue Ribbon" from the Government of Japan.

DEC. 2011 JAE received "2011 Top 100 Global Innovators Award" from Thomson Reuters.

== Globalization timeline ==
MAR.1977	Sales office established in North America
JUL.1984	Manufacturing plant constructed in Asia (Taiwan)
OCT. 1988	Manufacturing plant constructed in North America
APR. 1994	Sales office established in Asia (Hong Kong)
FEB. 1995	Sales office established in Asia (Singapore)
JAN. 1996	Sales office established in Asia (Korea)
JUN. 1996	Manufacturing plant constructed in Asia (Philippines)
SEP. 1996	Sales office established in Europe
JUL. 2001	Manufacturing plant constructed in Asia (China)
MAR. 2002	Manufacturing plant constructed in Asia (China)
JUN. 2003	Sales office established in Asia (China)
APR. 2010	Manufacturing plant established in Mexico

== Connector product lines ==
AUG.1955	Started manufacture and sales of "-connectors-" under Technical License Agreement with Cannon Electronic Co., U.S.A.(presently ITT Industries)

== Aerospace products ==
AUG.1961	Signed a technical assistance agreement with U.S.-based Honeywell to commence manufacturing of autoflight systems, fuel meters, liquid oxygen quantity indicators, and gyro devices and other equipment for the F-104J
