= Radio Frequency Systems =

Telecommunications company

Radio Frequency Systems (RFS) is a designer and manufacturer of wireless and broadcast cable solutions and accessories. Established in 1900, RFS operates across multiple sectors, including telecommunications, broadcasting, and industries including rail and mining.

The company operates factories and R&D centers in Germany and China. RFS's main sales offices and distribution centers outside Germany and China are located in Italy, United Kingdom, and United Arab Emirates.

== History ==
=== From 1900 to 1960s ===
==== Germany ====
The company was founded in Hannover, Germany, in 1900 by de:Louis Hackethal under the name of de:Hackethal-Draht-Gesellschaft, a German engineer who invented the first insulated wire. in 1951, Hackethal-Hannover developed the world's first RF power cable with corrugated coaxial transmission lines. After its merger in 1966 with de:Osnabrücker Kupfer- und Drahtwerke AG, the company took the name of Kabel-und Metallwerke Gutehoffnungshütte AG (Kabelmetal). It became particularly known for the marketing and sale of corrugated cable.

==== United States ====
American Tube Bending Co. (ATB) was founded in New Haven, Connecticut, United States, in 1910. Specialist in custom tube bending, ATB Co. built the engine manifold for Lindberg's "Spirit of Saint Louis". In 1933, James Lawrence Bernard Jr., student of Guglielmo Marconi, founded the Communication Product Company (CPC) in New Jersey, USA which later took the name of Celwave. During the second world war, the company started production of antennas for warships. Phelps Dodge, a producer of bulk coaxial cables successively acquired the ATB in 1959 and CPC in 1962. The company renamed itself to Phelps Dodge Communications Company.

=== From 1970s to 1982 ===
In 1973, Kabelmetal and Phelps Dodge Communications merge operations to cover North America, creating Cablewave Systems in North Haven, CT, USA. In 1975, Phelps Dodge sells its shares of Cablewave Systems and Cable Systems acquires Scientific Atlanta's microwave business. In 1976, Kabelmetal and the Italian Pirelli Cables joined in Brazil to form a new company, KMP Cabos Especiais e Sistemas Ltda (KMP Special Cables and Systems) in Embu-São Paulo. KMP soon became one of the main Brazilian suppliers with strong recognition in the marketplace as synonym of quality. In 1980, Phelps Dodge acquires RJ Communications Products, Inc. a prominent manufacturer of combiners and multicouplers, and HMP Antennafabrik, a Danish manufacturer or antenna system products. In 1982, Kabelmetal electro GmbH is acquired by Câbles de Lyon, which was a subsidiary of CGE (Compagnie Générale d’Electricité and future Alcatel)

=== From 1983 to 1999 ===
1983 is the birth of Radio Frequency Systems (RFS) within Kabelmetal. RFS in Germany, Brazil and France, Celwave R.F. and Cablewave in the United States, form a global entity to serve the world market called the RFS Group. In parallel, Câble de Lyon, a subsidiary of CGE (Companie Générale d'Electricité) acquires Kabelmetal and becomes the new legal owner of RFS.

The same year, Phelps Dodge acquires by Celwave Systems is renamed Celwave, R.F. and it acquires the point-to-point microwave and transmission line manufacturing business from M/A Com Prodelin. In 1984, start of the production of microwave antennas.

In 1987, RFS Australia is formed from the regrouping of Antenna Engineering Australia and Hills Antenna Systems, both with 20 years design and manufacturing experience in the Australasian RF market.

In 1991, CGE becomes Alcatel-Alsthom and subsequently Câbles de Lyon becomes Alcatel Câble, RFS Group remained part of it. In 1991, Celwave R.F adds receivers and multicouplers to its range by acquiring Janel Labs, a supplier of receiver multicoupler system components.

=== From 1999 to 2012 ===
In 1999, Cablewave, Celwave, and RFS merge worldwide operations and form Radio Frequency Systems, a global company, becoming holder of 100% of the capital of the subsidiaries comprising RFS Australia, Brazil, China, Germany, Cablewave US, Celwave in US, Denmark and France - with Alcatel as parent company. In parallel, RFS China is established and a manufacturing plant is opened in Shanghai (Songjiang). KMP is incorporated by RFS as RFS Brazil.

In 2006, Alcatel and Lucent Technologies merge, creating global telecom equipment giant. Alcatel-Lucent becomes the new mother company for RFS.

RFS is honored in the 60th Annual Emmy Awards for its pioneering work on "adjacent channel combiners" for TV broadcasting in 2009. The same year it is inducted into the prestigious Victorian Hall of Fame in Australia.

In 2008, RFS starts manufacturing in India (Kolkata) with local partner Reflex.

In 2012, RFS creates a RFS Holding GmbH incorporated in Hannover and moves ownership under Alcatel-Lucent Shanghai Bell. RFS sells CGTI to Camusat Group.

=== From 2013 to today ===
In 2016, Nokia completes the acquisition of Alcatel-Lucent, and RFS becomes part of Nokia.

In 2017, RFS expands its industrial footprint and opens its new factory in Suzhou, China.

In 2022, RFS stops local production in Brazil and ramps down production of broadcast antennas and combiners in Australia, followed by a ramp down of production of microwave antennas in France in 2023.

In 2023, Amphenol (USA) acquires the North American division of RFS’s cable business, as well as the global RFS Base Station Antenna business.

In April 2024, Nokia sold RFS cable-related operations RFS GmbH (Germany) and RFS Suzhou (China) to YOFC, a global player in optical fiber and optical cable technology. Nokia assigns RFS cable technology related intellectual property to RFS GmbH (Germany).

=== Research and Development ===
RFS has been granted multiple patents over the 20th and 21st centuries, including for:

- 1951: HELIFLEX the first RF power cable with corrugated coaxial transmission line
- 1961: CELLFLEX foam dielectric cables as the first corrugated welded coaxial cables
- 1972: RADIAFLEX the first radiating coaxial cable
- 2006: CELLFLEX Lite the first RF coaxial cable featuring an aluminum outer conductor
- 2009: HYBRIFLEX first hybrid feeder cabling solution for fiber and power connectivity

== Organization ==
Presidents:

- Jürgen W. Lühring 1983 - 1998
- Marvin S. (Eddie) Edwards Jr. 1999 - 2001
- Jörg Sellner 2001 - 2003
- Klaus-Dieter Mischerikow 2003 - 2005
- Stéphane Klajzyngier 2005 - 2014
- Jacques Schaffnit 2014 - 2016
- Herbert Merz 2017 - 2019
- Monika Maurer 2019–2024
