= Essential Video Coding =

Video compression standard

EVC / MPEG-5 Part 1
- Essential Video Coding
- Status: Draft
- Year started: 2018 (Initial Requirements Document)
- Organization: ISO
- Committee: MPEG
- Domain: Video compression
- Website: Official Webpage

MPEG-5 Essential Video Coding (EVC), standardized as ISO/IEC 23094-1, is a video compression standard that has been completed in April 2020 by decision of MPEG Working Group 11 at its 130th meeting.

The standard consists of a royalty-free subset and individually switchable enhancements.

== Concept ==
The publicly available requirements document outlines a development process that is defensive against patent threats: Two sets of coding tools, base and enhanced, are defined:

- The base consist of tools that were made public more than 20 years ago or for which a Type 1 declaration is received. Type 1, or option 1, means "royalty-free", in the nomenclature used in ISO documents.
- The "enhanced" set consists of 21 other tools which have passed an extra compression efficiency justification and which can be disabled individually.

Each of the 21 payable tools can have separately acquired and separately negotiated and separately Traded License agreements. Each can be individually turned off and, when necessary, replaced by a corresponding cost free baseline profile tool. This structure makes it easy to fall back to a smaller set of tools in the future, if, for example, licensing complications occur around a specific tool, without breaking compatibility with already deployed decoders.

This video codec is compatible with hardware accelerators - decoders originally developed for older standards such as AVC/HEVC at least in the Baseline profile.

A proposal by Samsung, Huawei and Qualcomm forms the basis of EVC.

== Implementations ==
- XEVE (eXtra-fast Essential Video Encoder) is self-described as a fast open source EVC encoder. It is written in C99 and supports both the baseline and main profiles of EVC. Its license is a custom 3-clause BSD license.
- FFmpeg version 7.1 officially supports encoding and decoding using official external library above (for encoding) and decoder library: eXtra-fast Essential Video Decoder (XEVD).

== MPAI-EVC ==
MPAI aims to significantly enhance the performance of EVC by improving or replacing traditional tools with AI-based tools, with the goal of reaching at least 25% improvement over the baseline profile of EVC.

== See also ==
- MPEG-5 Part 2 / Low Complexity Enhancement Video Coding / LCEVC
- H.266 / MPEG-I Part 3 / Versatile Video Coding / VVC
- IP core - Semiconductor intellectual property core - Licensing scheme based on similar solutions as for MPEG-5 Part 1: EVC
