= Envivio =

Envivio, Inc.
- Envivio logo
- Type: Public
- Traded as: Nasdaq: ENVI
- Industry: Video software
- Founded: 2000; 26 years ago
- Founder: Julien Signes
- Fate: Acquired by Ericsson
- Headquarters: South San Francisco, California, United States
- Area served: Worldwide
- Key people: Julien Signes (president & CEO)
- Revenue: $50.6 million (2012)
- Number of employees: 500(2015)
- Website: envivio.com

Envivio, Inc. was a software-based video processing and delivery company. It was founded in 2000 in San Francisco by Julien Signes, the president and CEO. In 2015, the company was acquired by Ericsson. In 2019, Ericsson sold its television business unit to One Equity Partners, the resulting company is named MediaKind.

When founded, Envivio focused on developing technologies supported by the MPEG-4 standard, a standard for audio and video coding formats and related technology.

Envivio was headquartered in South San Francisco with offices in Singapore, Beijing, Denver (Colorado) and Rennes.

== History ==
Envivio was created in 2000 as a spin-off of the France Telecom R&D Labs in San Francisco and Rennes. The co-founders were contributors to the specification and development of MPEG-4, which is available on most consumer devices. The company holds 17 patents dating as far back as 2000. Envivio went public on April 25, 2012.

In September 2015, Envivio was bought by Ericsson Television.

A video from Envivio is used as an MPD steaming example in the dash.js open source DASH web player.

== Products ==
Envivio products include encoders and transcodes, network media Processors, gateways and multiplexers, management systems, quality controls and platforms. The company has been a pioneer in software-based, over-the-top delivery to multiple screens.

In 2014, Envivio was contracted to provide 4K UHDTV coverage of the French Open for TDF, to assist Globosat in providing 4K coverage of the 2014 FIFA World Cup and also to provide the only live multi-screen coverage for Comcast, and to provide cloud-based video multiscreen transcoding services for Beijing Gehua CATV Network Co. using its Muse software.

== See also ==
- High Efficiency Video Coding
- MPEG-2
- H.264/MPEG-4 AVC
- IPTV
- HDMI
