= MediaKind =

Video technology company

- Type: Public company
- Industry: Digital video technology
- Founded: 2018 as MediaKind
- Headquarters: Denver, CO, United States
- Key people: CEO: Allen Broome
- Products: Advanced video compression, linear, on-demand, and interactive television systems
- Number of employees: Over 1100
- Website: https://mediakind.com/

MediaKind (formerly Ericsson Television) is a global video technology company providing MPEG-4 AVC, MPEG-2 and HEVC encoding and decoding solutions, as well as stream processing, packaging, network adaption and related products, for Cloud, Contribution & Distribution (C+D), IPTV, Cable, DTT, Satellite DTH and OTT. The global headquarters are located in Denver, CO, USA, with additional offices in Southampton (UK) and Rennes (France).

The company has its roots in the Tandberg Television company that was founded in 1979 and acquired by Ericsson in 2007, as well as Envivio; founded in 2000 and acquired by Ericsson in 2015.

== Company history ==
=== Roots ===
Tandberg was a long-standing Norwegian company whose history went back to the 1930s when it supplied domestic radio equipment. It grew into other areas during the decades after WW2 including a well-respected audio equipment manufacturer and its reel-to-reel tape recorders were sought after by HiFi enthusiasts.

The Kjelsas factory also started producing TV sets in 1960, and in 1966, a second TV plant was opened in Kjeller in Skedsmo. Color TVs were added to their lineup in 1969. In 1972, Tandberg purchased Radionette, another large Norwegian electronics firm that has just begun focusing on televisions.

By 1976, TVs were Tandberg's major product and their factories employed 3,500. However, that same year a major economic downturn seriously disrupted the company, and by 1978 it was insolvent. A shareholder revolt removed Vebjorn Tandberg from control of the company, and he committed suicide in August. In December the company declared bankruptcy.

Tandberg Television, originally with headquarters in Lillestrom near Oslo, Norway, was formed in 1979 when the original Tandberg company split into Tandberg, Tandberg Data, and Tandberg Television.

=== After the breakup of 1979 ===
In 1999, Tandberg Television entered into a £170 million agreement to acquire all the assets of NDS Group’s Digital-TV products business, the Digital Broadcasting Business (DBB), a subsidiary of News Corporation. After the acquisition, Tandberg Television could offer digital video compression encoders, multiplexers and modulation products for large satellite DTH systems, terrestrial networks and mobile news gathering solutions.

NDS Group itself was a merger in 1996 between News Corp's existing News Data Communications (NDC) based in Israel, a company that supplied smart cards to pay TV operators like Sky TV, and Digi-Media Vision (DMV) a video compression company that News had acquired in 1995, and had been the Advanced Products Division [APD] of National Transcommunications Limited [NTL] in the UK. NTL was itself established in 1990 as the privatised Engineering arm of the Independent Broadcasting Authority (IBA), the UK commercial broadcasting regulator and operator of all commercial terrestrial television and radio transmitters. APD was the Experimental and Development (E&D) department of the IBA.

Much earlier, in 1987, Tandberg Television and the IBA's E&D and Satellite Engineering groups had worked together to build a satellite broadcasting system for the UK based on the ill-fated MAC system operated by Sky's rival British Satellite Broadcasting (BSB). BSB and Sky merged in 1990 to form British Sky Broadcasting (BSkyB) which has become a significant broadcaster in the UK.

Since 1999, Tandberg Television has acquired four US-based digital media companies. In October 2005, they acquired Los Angeles-based Goldpocket Interactive, an interactive technology provider for digital television, the Internet and wireless/mobile networks. Further, in February 2006, they acquired SkyStream Networks, a provider of Internet Protocol MPEG-2 and MPEG-4 AVC video delivery technologies, based in Sunnyvale, California. Later the same year, they acquired Los Angeles-based Internet TV software developer Zetools.

=== 2007–2010: Acquisition by Ericsson ===
In April 2007, Tandberg Television was acquired by Ericsson. Ericsson Television operates as an independent entity.

The company was honored with its first Technology & Engineering Emmy Award in 2008 for the development of interactive Video-on-Demand infrastructure and signaling, leading to large scale VOD implementations. It was also awarded another Emmy in 2009 for Pioneering Development of MPEG-4 AVC systems for HDTV, thanks to the implementation and deployment of the first HD MPEG-4 AVC (H.264) Broadcast encoder.

In 2010, the company was renamed Ericsson Television.

In 2011, for the Pioneering Development and Deployment of Active Format Description Technology and System. In 2013, the company acquired another Emmy award for the Pioneering Development Of Video On Demand (VOD) Dynamic Advertising Insertion. Recently in 2014, Ericsson got its fifth Emmy® Award recognition for its work in developing pioneering JPEG2000 interoperability technology.

=== 2018–today: MediaKind ===
In 2018, Ericsson completed the successful consolidation of all acquired businesses connected to Tandberg Television/Ericsson Television, along with Envivio, Microsoft Mediaroom, Azuki Reach, and Fabrix Video Storage and Processing Platform (VSPP), plus its own Media Delivery Network (MDN). This combined business was rebranded as MediaKind. It was announced that Ericsson has partnered with One Equity Partners, a private equity firm with expertise in media and telecom investments, to further develop Media Solutions. In January 2019, Ericsson transferred the majority of shares in its Media Solutions business (51%) to One Equity Partners as part of a divestment. Ericsson itself retained 49%.

In December 2025, it was announced MediaKind had given the San Jose, CA-headquartered video technology company, Harmonic Inc., a binding offer to acquire its video business segment for approximately $145 million in cash.
