= MPEG LA =

Patent licensing company

MPEG Licensing Administration, LLC
- Type: Private
- Industry: Licensing administration
- Founded: 1996; 30 years ago
- Defunct: May 2, 2023
- Headquarters: Denver, Colorado, US
- Key people: Larry Horn
- Products: Patent licenses
- Website: via-la.com

MPEG LA was an American company based in Denver, Colorado, that licensed patent pools covering essential patents required for use of the MPEG-2, MPEG-4, IEEE 1394, VC-1, ATSC, MVC, MPEG-2 Systems, AVC/H.264 and HEVC standards.

Via Licensing Corp acquired MPEG LA in April 2023 and formed a new patent pool administration company called Via Licensing Alliance.

== History ==
MPEG LA started operations in July 1997 immediately after receiving a Department of Justice Business Review Letter. During formation of the MPEG-2 standard, a working group of companies that participated in the formation of the MPEG-2 standard recognized that the biggest challenge to adoption was efficient access to essential patents owned by many patent owners. That ultimately led to a group of various MPEG-2 patent owners to form MPEG LA, which in turn created the first modern-day patent pool as a solution. The majority of patents underlying MPEG-2 technology were owned by three companies: Sony (311 patents), Thomson (198 patents) and Mitsubishi Electric (119 patents).

In June 2012, MPEG LA announced a call for patents essential to the High Efficiency Video Coding (HEVC) standard.

In September 2012, MPEG LA launched Librassay, which makes diagnostic patent rights from some of the world's leading research institutions available to everyone through a single license. Organizations which have included patents in Librassay include Johns Hopkins University; Ludwig Institute for Cancer Research; Memorial Sloan Kettering Cancer Center; National Institutes of Health (NIH); Partners HealthCare; The Board of Trustees of the Leland Stanford Junior University; The Trustees of the University of Pennsylvania; The University of California, San Francisco; and Wisconsin Alumni Research Foundation (WARF).

On September 29, 2014, the MPEG LA announced their HEVC license which covers the patents from 23 companies. The license is US$0.20 per HEVC product after the first 100,000 units each year with an annual cap. The license has been expanded to include the profiles in version 2 of the HEVC standard.

On March 5, 2015, the MPEG LA announced their DisplayPort license which is US$0.20 per DisplayPort product.

In April 2023, in what is thought to be the first time that two pool administrators have merged into one, Via Licensing Corp acquired MPEG LA and formed a new patent pool administrator called Via Licensing Alliance. Via President Heath Hoglund will serve as president of the new company. MPEG LA CEO Larry Horn will serve as a Via LA advisor.

== Criticism ==
MPEG LA has claimed that video codecs such as Theora and VP8 infringe on patents owned by its licensors, without disclosing the affected patent or patents. They then called out for “any party that believes it has patents that are essential to the VP8 video codec”. In April 2013, Google and MPEG LA announced an agreement covering the VP8 video format.

In May 2010, Nero AG filed an antitrust suit against MPEG LA, claiming it "unlawfully extended its patent pools by adding non-essential patents to the MPEG-2 patent pool" and has been inconsistent in charging royalty fees. The United States District Court for the Central District of California dismissed the suit with prejudice on November 29, 2010.

David Balto, who is a former policy director at the Federal Trade Commission, has used the MPEG-2 patent pool as an example of why patent pools need more scrutiny so that they do not suppress innovation.

The MPEG-2 patent pool began with 100 patents in 1997 and since then additional patents were added. The MPEG-2 license agreement states that if possible the license fee will not increase when new patents are added. The MPEG-2 license agreement stated that MPEG-2 royalties must be paid when there is one or more active patents in either the country of manufacture or the country of sale. The original MPEG-2 license rate was US$4 for a decoding license, US$4 for an encoding license and US$6.00 for encode-decode consumer product.

A criticism of the MPEG-2 patent pool is that even though the number of patents decreased from 1,048 to 416 by June 2013 the license fee did not decrease with the expiration rate of MPEG-2 patents. For products from January 1, 2002, through December 31, 2009 royalties were US$2.50 for a decoding license, US$2.50 for an encoding license and US$2.50 for encode-decode consumer product license. Since January 1, 2010, MPEG-2 patent pool royalties were US$2.00 for a decoding license, US$2.00 for an encoding license and US$2.00 for encode-decode consumer product.

== H.264/MPEG-4 AVC licensors ==
The following organizations hold one or more patents in MPEG LA's H.264/AVC patent pool.

H.264/AVC patent holders (as of December 2022)
| Organization | Active patents | Expired patents | Total patents |
|---|---|---|---|
| Panasonic Corporation | 1,054 | 416 | 1,470 |
| Godo Kaisha IP Bridge | 1,033 | 267 | 1,300 |
| LG Electronics | 871 | 130 | 1001 |
| Dolby Laboratories | 1014 | 414 | 1428 |
| Toshiba | 59 | 336 | 395 |
| Microsoft | 95 | 145 | 240 |
| Nippon Telegraph and Telephone (including NTT Docomo) | 234 | 4 | 238 |
| Sony | 77 | 77 | 154 |
| Fraunhofer Society | 208 | 16 | 224 |
| Google | 5 | 134 | 139 |
| GE Video Compression | 136 | 0 | 136 |
| Fujitsu | 92 | 14 | 106 |
| Mitsubishi Electric | 44 | 56 | 100 |
| Tagivan II LLC | 82 | 0 | 82 |
| Samsung Electronics | 17 | 46 | 63 |
| Maxell | 54 | 2 | 56 |
| Philips | 6 | 41 | 47 |
| Vidyo | 41 | 2 | 43 |
| Ericsson | 1 | 33 | 34 |
| Electronics and Telecommunications Research Institute (ETRI) of Korea | 10 | 25 | 35 |
| Siemens | 12 | 39 | 51 |
| The Trustees of Columbia University in New York City | 0 | 26 | 26 |
| Polycom | 2 | 20 | 22 |
| Robert Bosch GmbH | 0 | 22 | 22 |
| Apple | 7 | 2 | 9 |
| JVC Kenwood | 3 | 5 | 8 |
| Orange S.A. | 13 | 7 | 20 |
| Sharp Corporation | 5 | 0 | 5 |
| Korea Advanced Institute of Science and Technology (KAIST) | 1 | 4 | 5 |
| Cisco Systems | 3 | 1 | 4 |
| ZTE Corporation | 0 | 2 | 2 |
| Cisco Technology | 1 | 0 | 1 |
| Cable Television Laboratories, Inc. | 0 | 1 | 1 |
| Hewlett-Packard Company | 0 | 1 | 1 |
| Beijing Xiaomi Mobile Software Co. | 5 | 1 | 6 |
| B1 Institute of Image Technology | 6 | 0 | 6 |
| Newracom, Inc. | 0 | 1 | 1 |
| NEC | 5 | 1 | 6 |
| Vestel Elektronik Sanayi ve Ticaret A.S. | 1 | 0 | 1 |
| Total (All Manufacturers) | 5197 | 2291 | 7488 |

== HEVC licensors ==
The following organizations hold one or more patents in the HEVC patent pool.

HEVC patent holders (as of July 2019)
| Organization | Active patents | Expired patents | Total patents |
|---|---|---|---|
| Samsung Electronics | 3,550 | 4 | 3,554 |
| M&K Holdings | 907 | 0 | 907 |
| Nippon Telegraph and Telephone (including NTT Docomo) | 878 | 2 | 880 |
| JVC Kenwood Corporation | 628 | 0 | 628 |
| Infobridge Pte. Ltd. | 572 | 0 | 572 |
| SK Telecom (including SK Planet) | 380 | 0 | 380 |
| KT Corp | 289 | 0 | 289 |
| NEC Corporation | 219 | 0 | 219 |
| Electronics and Telecommunications Research Institute (ETRI) of Korea | 208 | 0 | 208 |
| Canon Inc. | 180 | 0 | 180 |
| Tagivan II | 162 | 0 | 162 |
| Fujitsu | 144 | 1 | 145 |
| Kyung Hee University | 103 | 0 | 103 |
| Apple | 69 | 0 | 69 |
| Intellectual Discovery Co. | 67 | 0 | 67 |
| Maxell | 60 | 0 | 60 |
| IBEX PT Holdings | 58 | 0 | 58 |
| Vidyo | 41 | 0 | 41 |
| Korea Advanced Institute of Science and Technology (KAIST) | 38 | 0 | 38 |
| HUMAX Holdings | 32 | 0 | 32 |
| Kwangwoon University | 24 | 0 | 24 |
| Siemens | 13 | 8 | 21 |
| Korean Broadcasting System | 20 | 0 | 20 |
| Orange S.A. | 20 | 0 | 20 |
| BBC | 19 | 0 | 19 |
| The Trustees of Columbia University in New York City | 0 | 16 | 16 |
| Sejong University | 13 | 0 | 13 |
| Korea Aerospace University | 12 | 0 | 12 |
| Hangzhou Hikvision Digital Technology | 10 | 0 | 10 |
| Sungkyunkwan University | 8 | 0 | 8 |
| Nippon Hoso Kyokai (NHK) | 7 | 0 | 7 |
| Sky Media Tech, Inc. | 3 | 0 | 3 |
| Digital Insights Inc. | 2 | 0 | 2 |
| Alpha Digitech | 1 | 0 | 1 |
| MIT | 1 | 0 | 1 |
| Newracom (Newratek) | 0 | 1 | 1 |
| Total (All Manufacturers) | 8738 | 32 | 8770 |

== VC-1 licensors ==
The following organizations hold one or more patents in the VC-1 patent pool (as of November 26, 2024).

| Organization | Active patents | Expired patents | Total patents |
|---|---|---|---|
| Microsoft | 64 | 402 | 466 |
| Panasonic | 5 | 117 | 122 |
| LG Electronics | 3 | 93 | 96 |
| Samsung Electronics | 2 | 94 | 96 |
| Dolby Laboratories | 8 | 96 | 104 |
| Philips | 0 | 77 | 77 |
| Hitachi | 0 | 60 | 60 |
| Mitsubishi Electric | 0 | 52 | 52 |
| Sony | 0 | 28 | 28 |
| JVC Kenwood | 0 | 25 | 25 |
| Toshiba | 0 | 21 | 21 |
| Fujitsu | 0 | 20 | 20 |
| Telenor | 0 | 19 | 19 |
| Siemens | 2 | 16 | 18 |
| AT&T Intellectual Property | 0 | 16 | 16 |
| Sun Patent Trust | 0 | 12 | 12 |
| Sharp Corporation | 0 | 8 | 8 |
| Orange S.A. | 0 | 7 | 7 |
| Nippon Telegraph and Telephone | 0 | 4 | 4 |
| Pantech | 0 | 4 | 4 |
| ZTE | 0 | 1 | 1 |
| Total (All Manufacturers) | 89 | 1167 | 1256 |

== See also ==
- Avanci
- DVD6C
