= Via-LA =

Patent licensing company

Via Licensing Alliance
- Type: Private
- Industry: Licensing administration
- Founded: 2023; 3 years ago
- Headquarters: San Francisco, California, US
- Key people: Heath Hoglund
- Products: Patent licenses
- Website: www.via-la.com

Via-LA is an American company based in San Francisco, California that licenses patent pools covering essential patents.

Via Licensing Corp acquired MPEG-LA in April 2023 and formed a new patent pool administration company called Via Licensing Alliance.

== History ==
In April 2023, in what is thought to be the first time that two pool administrators have merged into one, Via Licensing Corp acquired MPEG-LA and formed a new patent pool administrator called Via Licensing Alliance. Via President Heath Hoglund will serve as president of the new company. MPEG-LA CEO Larry Horn will serve as a Via-LA advisor.

In April 2025, three licensors of the Via LA HEVC Patent Pool (M&K Holdings, Gensquare, and Tagivan II) filed a patent infringement suit against Microsoft in a German court, alleging unlicensed use of High Efficiency Video Coding (HEVC) technology in several Microsoft products.

== H.265/HEVC licensors ==
This is a dynamic list and may never be able to satisfy particular standards for completeness. You can help by adding missing items with reliable sources.

The following organizations hold one or more patents in the Via-LA H.265/HEVC patent pool, this list does not include patents that have been removed from the patent pool.

H.265/HEVC patent holders (as of November 23 2023)
Organization	Active patents	Expired patents	Total patents
GENSQUARE LLC	1469	30	1499
Canon Inc.	1011	59	1070
M&K Holdings	1055	1	1056
KT Corp	595	0	595
Tagivan II	311	48	359
Fujitsu	148	1	149
Apple	72	53	125
IdeaHub Inc.	120	0	120
Maxell	64	10	74
Orange S.A.	58	5	63
IBEX PT Holdings	62	0	62
Vidyo	43	0	43
HUMAX Holdings	34	0	34
Siemens	10	19	29
Industry-Academy Cooperation Foundation of Sejong University	27	2	29
B1 Institute of Image Technology, INC	26	0	26
British Broadcasting Corporation	22	0	22
Funai Electric Co., Ltd	17	0	17
The Trustees of Columbia University in New York City	0	16	16
Hangzhou Boyun Technology Co., Ltd	12	0	12
Hangzhou Hikvision Digital Technology	11	0	11
SungKyunKwan University Research & Business Foundation	11	0	11
Nippon Hoso Kyokai (NHK)	7	0	7
Beijing Xiaomi Mobile Software Co., Ltd	0	6	6
SK Planet	5	0	5
Sky Media Tech, Inc.	4	0	4
Reef LLC	3	0	3
Digital Insights Inc.	2	0	2
Korea Electronics Technology Institute	1	0	1
Alpha Digitech	1	0	1
Massachusetts Institute of Technology (MIT)	1	0	1
ARRIS Enterprises, LLC, a CommScope Company	1	0	1
Newracom Inc. (Newratek)	0	1	1
Total (All Manufacturers)	5203	251	5454

== H.264/MPEG-4 AVC licensors ==
This is a dynamic list and may never be able to satisfy particular standards for completeness. You can help by adding missing items with reliable sources.

The following organizations hold one or more patents in Via-LA's H.264/AVC patent pool.

H.264/AVC patent holders (as of November 11 2026)
Organization	Active patents	Expired patents	Total patents
Dolby Laboratories	780	841	1621
Panasonic Corporation	204	1394	1598
Godo Kaisha IP Bridge	31	1267	1298
LG Electronics	15	984	999
Toshiba	6	389	395
Fraunhofer Society	137	121	258
Microsoft	4	237	241
Nippon Telegraph and Telephone (including NTT Docomo)	2	236	238
Sony	38	193	231
Google	1	139	140
GE Video Compression	0	136	136
Fujitsu	0	106	106
Mitsubishi Electric	2	98	100
Tagivan II LLC	1	82	83
B1 Institute of Image Technology	68	0	68
Samsung Electronics	0	63	63
Maxell	0	56	56
Siemens	4	47	51
Koninklijke Philips N.V	2	47	49
Vidyo	40	3	43
Electronics and Telecommunications Research Institute (ETRI) of Korea	2	33	35
Ericsson	0	35	35
The Trustees of Columbia University in New York City	0	26	26
Robert Bosch GmbH	0	23	23
Polycom	1	20	21
Orange S.A.	3	17	20
JVC Kenwood	10	8	18
Apple	0	9	9
Beijing Xiaomi Mobile Software Co.	0	6	6
NEC	0	6	6
Sharp Corporation	4	1	5
Electronics and Telecommunications Research Institute and Korea Advanced Institute of Science and Technology (KAIST)	1	4	5
Cisco Systems	1	3	4
ZTE Corporation	0	2	2
Cisco Technology	1	0	1
Cable Television Laboratories, Inc.	0	1	1
Hewlett-Packard Company	0	1	1
Newracom, Inc.	0	1	1
Vestel Elektronik Sanayi ve Ticaret A.S.	1	0	1
Total (All Manufacturers)	1359	6635	7994

== VC-1 licensors ==
This is a dynamic list and may never be able to satisfy particular standards for completeness. You can help by adding missing items with reliable sources.

The following organizations hold one or more patents in the Via-LA VC-1 patent pool. LG has now removed their 1 remaining patent (US8428141) from the pool but it has been kept listed in the table below as it is still a valid patent and expires on 2028-08-24.

VC-1 patent holders (as of November 11 2026)
Organization	Active patents	Expired patents	Total patents
Microsoft	35	437	472
Panasonic	1	121	122
LG Electronics	1	95	96
Samsung Electronics	0	96	96
Dolby Laboratories	3	102	105
Philips	0	77	77
Hitachi	0	60	60
Mitsubishi Electric	0	52	52
Sony	0	28	28
JVC Kenwood	0	25	25
Toshiba	0	21	21
Fujitsu	0	20	20
Telenor	0	19	19
Siemens	0	18	18
AT&T Intellectual Property	0	16	16
Sun Patent Trust	0	12	12
Sharp Corporation	0	8	8
Orange S.A.	0	7	7
Nippon Telegraph and Telephone	0	4	4
Pantech	0	4	4
ZTE	0	1	1
Total (All Manufacturers)	40	1223	1263
