= Comparison of H.264 and VC-1 =

H.264 and VC-1 are two competing video compression standards.

== Overview ==
	VC-1	H.264
Goals	Designed to offer very high image quality with excellent compression efficiency	Designed to meet a variety of industry needs with many profiles and levels, allowing for varying compression, quality and CPU usage levels, where the lowest level is for portable devices, designed with low CPU usage in mind, while the high levels are designed with very high quality and compression efficiency in mind
Example industry use	Supports 4:2:0 compression / color space	Supports studio archiving requirements with 4:4:4 color space; separate black and white (BW) video mode
Licensing costs	Similar	
Documentation	Not free. Reference decoder, comes with external documentation.	? AVC/H264 Licensing costs and terms from MPEG LA. Reference encoder and decoder free as well. Additionally, JVT & M4IF mailing lists are available where one may receive answers on AVC related questions.

== Terminology ==
All sources for the below information are from the respective specifications listed in the overview section.

Feature	VC-1	H.264
Partition sizes	16×16 and 8×8	16×16, 16×8, 8×16, 8×8, 8×4, 4×8, and 4×4
Integer transform	8×8, 4×8, 8×4, and 4×4	4×4; 8×8 available in High Profile only
Frame	Used for progressive or interlaced content	
Macroblock sizes	16×16 only	
Motion vector	Two dimensional vector offset from current position to reference frame	
Picture	A field or frame	
Skipped macroblock	No data is encoded for macroblock	

== Features ==
	VC-1	H.264
Bitstream formats	single bit stream	NAL and byte stream
Bitstream format	In advanced profile, each Bitstream Data Unit has its own header. Simple and Main profile provide neither sequence nor entry point headers.	SPS (sequence parameter set), PPS (picture parameters set), slice header, macroblock
Deblocking filter	In-loop filter and overlap transform	In-loop only
CABAC	No	Only supported in Main and higher profiles
Variable transform size	Yes	Only in High profile and above
Slice	Contiguous (integer number of macroblock rows only)	Contiguous or non-contiguous
Sub-pixel interpolation methods	bicubic, bilinear	6-tap filter for half pixels; averaging for quarter pixels
Variable Length Coding	Yes	
B frame used for predicting other pictures	Yes	

== Adoption ==
H.264 is by far the most commonly used format for the recording, compression, and distribution of video content, used by 79% of video industry developers as of December 2024.
