= FMO =

FMO may refer to:

- Fenna-Matthews-Olson complex
- Fish Marketing Organisation, a statutory body of Hong Kong
- Flavin-containing monooxygenase
- Flexible macroblock ordering
- Fragment molecular orbital
- Francisco Morazán Department, a department in Honduras
- Frontier molecular orbital theory
- Münster Osnabrück Airport in North Rhine-Westphalia, Germany
- Netherlands Development Finance Company (Dutch: Nederlandse Financierings-Maatschappij voor Ontwikkelingslanden N.V.)

== See also ==
- FOMO, or fear of missing out
