= DVD6C =

Consortium of large companies controlling DVD patents

- Digital Versatile Disk licensing group of 6 Consortium
- Formation: 1999; 27 years ago
- Founder: Eight leading developers of DVD technology and formats
- Type: Industry consortium
- Legal status: Inactive
- Purpose: License DVD technology in a patent pool
- Location: Tokyo, Japan
- Region served: Worldwide
- Products: Patents related to DVD manufacturing
- Members: 9 (peak) (2006)
- Owner: Its members
- Vice President: Toshihiro Shinohara
- Website: www.dvd6cla.com

The DVD6C Licensing Agency or DVD6C Licensing Group was an industry consortium which licenses a portfolio of patents required to produce DVD discs, players, drives, recorders, decoders, and encoders.

== History ==
The group was founded in 1999 by 6 members to provide a patent pool.

By 2006, the group comprises 9 members: Hitachi, JVC, Matsushita (Panasonic), Mitsubishi, Sanyo, Sharp, Toshiba, Warner Home Video and Samsung.

As of January 1, 2020, DVD6C was no longer granting licenses to new licensees.

== See also ==
- Patent pool
- MPEG LA
- Avanci
