= Digital Rapids Corporation =

Software company in Canada

- Digital Rapids Corporation Logo
- Company type: Private
- Industry: Video software
- Founded: 2001
- Headquarters: Markham, Ontario; Canada
- Number of employees: 100 (2012)
- Website: digitalrapids.com

Digital Rapids Corporation is a privately held technology company headquartered in Markham, Ontario, Canada that produces hardware and software for the digital media industry. Founded in 2001, Digital Rapids develops systems and software for media ingest, multi-screen video encoding, transcoding, streaming, and workflow automation. Media and entertainment companies using Digital Rapids products include Deluxe, Foxtel, the Miami Heat NBA team, NBC Universal, Starz and Turner Broadcasting. A variety of customers in education, government, corporate and worship markets also use Digital Rapids products.

On April 7, 2014, Digital Rapids was acquired by Imagine Communications.

== Products ==
=== StreamZ & StreamZHD ===
StreamZ & StreamZHD are standard-definition and high-definition ingest and encoding systems supporting video ingest from live and pre-recorded sources, and real-time output in multiple formats to live streams or archive files.

=== Transcode Manager ===
Transcode Manager is enterprise-class software that automates the process of transforming large volumes of digital media files from one format to another.

=== StreamZ Live ===
StreamZ Live is a video encoding system for live-to-live applications, such as streaming live events or programs to IPTV, and mobile platforms.

=== Broadcast Manager ===
Broadcast Manager is enterprise-class software that controls and automates the multiple output streams of Digital Rapids encoders.

=== TouchStream ===
TouchStream is a portable streaming encoder for live video sources with a 7-inch touch-interface display.

=== Kayak ===
Kayak is a workflow management system and automation platform and the underlying technology platform for recent versions of other Digital Rapids products.

=== Flux ===
Flux is a series of PCI-Express video capture and pre-processing cards that can be integrated into Windows computers.

== Awards ==
- Streaming Media magazine, Readersí Choice Awards (2009, 2010, 2011, 2012)
- CSI magazine, CSI Awards (2010 ìBest Web TV Technology or Serviceî, 2012 ìBest Workflow/Asset management/Automation Solutionî)
- Deluxe Outstanding Technical Achievement Award, 2012
- TV Technology Europe magazine, Superior Technology (STAR) Awards (2008, 2009, 2010, 2011)
- TVBEurope magazine, ìBest of IBC Editorís Awardî (2008, 2009, 2011)
- Frost & Sullivan Market Share Leadership Award and Hot Company Watchlist, 2009, ìBroadband Transcoding Marketî
- IBC Innovation Award, 2008
- Broadcast Engineering magazine Pick Hit Award, 2008
- Frost & Sullivan Customer Value Enhancement and Entrepreneurial Company of the Year Awards, 2008, ìWorld Video Encoders and Transcoders Marketî
- PROFIT Magazine, PROFIT 100 Canadaís Fastest-Growing Companies, 2007

== See also ==
- AVCHD
- H.264/MPEG-4
- VC-1
- adaptive bitrate streaming
- transcoding
- video codec
- content delivery network
- streaming media
