= Vidyo =

Visual communication company

Vidyo, Inc.
- Type: Private
- Industry: Video Communications
- Founded: 2005; 21 years ago
- Headquarters: Hackensack, New Jersey,
- Key people: Reuben Tozman (General Manager); Dr. Alex Eleftheriadis (Chief Scientist & co-founder)
- Products: Personal Telepresence systems, embedded video communications, videoconferencing endpoints & infrastructure, video chat, cloud services and APIs
- Revenue: ▲$60 Million(2019)
- Number of employees: 120
- Website: www.vidyo.com

Vidyo, Inc., founded as Layered Media, provides software-based collaboration technology and product-based visual communication products. It is currently owned by Enghouse Systems. The company's VidyoConferencing products are the first in the videoconferencing industry to take advantage of the H.264 standard for video compression, Scalable Video Coding (SVC).

The firm's implementation of this technology enables video communication across general purpose IP networks.

== History ==
Vidyo was founded by Ofer Shapiro, who had developed the first IP video conferencing bridge and programmable gatekeeper technology at Radvision. He left Radvision in early 2004 to develop improved video conferencing networks. Packet loss and latency that accompanies general purpose IP networks posed significant challenges to the existing systems. Costly dedicated networks and expensive Multipoint Control Units (MCU), which exacerbated delay due to transcoding or forced all endpoints to conform to the least common denominator endpoint quality, were the only products the industry had to offer at that time. He realized that to take advantage of state of the art H.264 compression technology, the fundamental technology behind video conferencing systems had to change. Shapiro's efforts resulted in a paradigm shift for the video conferencing industry - a new system architecture. It was based upon Scalable Video Coding (SVC) which allowed for error resiliency which was absent in monolithic encoding schemes that were common throughout the industry. Implementation of SVC for only some system components offered little value. The full benefit of SVC required re-designing both the endpoint (client) and MCU (server), a costly and time-consuming proposition for incumbent providers of video conferencing systems. Unencumbered by a legacy product line, Shapiro developed a new architecture in which the MCU was replaced with a low-cost router and all of the encoding and decoding was done at the end points.

At the end of 2004, Shapiro obtained support from Avery More in early 2005; and secured seed funding by October 2005, led by on Bayless of Sevin Rosen Funds. Operating in stealth mode through the beginning of 2007, Shapiro's team created a video conferencing product with HD quality video, that effectively addressed the interactivity inhibiting delay common in legacy systems, and enabled each end point to send and receive at its highest quality levels, irrespective of the other end points and the network. Layered Media licensed its technology to its first OEM customers early in 2007.

In June 2007 Layered Media secured series B funding, with Rho Ventures joining in to lead the round. Shortly after Layered Media changed its name to Vidyo, Inc.

By the beginning of 2008, Vidyo emerged from stealth mode with a product offering for the enterprise market and an annual licensing price model.

In the first quarter of 2009, Vidyo raised another round of funding, led by Menlo Ventures joining Rho Ventures, Sevin Rosen Funds, and Star Ventures.

In early April 2010, the company announced another $25 million from their Series C round of financing, bringing the total amount of capital raised by the company to $63 million since its founding in 2005. All existing investors, Menlo Ventures, Rho Ventures, Sevin Rosen Funds and Star Ventures, participated in the round, which was led by Four Rivers Group.

In May 2010, Vidyo launched its Software Development Kit (SDK), enabling developers to build multipoint video conferencing applications into Android and Moblin-based smart phones and tablets running Intel Atom Processor Z6xx series-based platforms (formerly Moorestown) and on ARM processor-based platforms.

In June 2010, at Infocomm in Las Vegas, Vidyo demonstrated the first videoconferencing system to attain 1440p (decode), at 2560 × 1440p resolution, in an HD multiparty video conference via general purpose IP networks.

A few days later, the company announced a partnership with HP to expand the HP Halo portfolio to include conference room and desktop endpoints that run on enterprise networks.

In May 2012, Vidyo announced a fourth round of funding securing $22.5 million bringing the total amount invested to $97 million.

In April 2013, Vidyo announced a fifth round of funding securing $17.1 million bringing the total amount invested to $116 million.

In March 2016, Vidyo integration was added to KioWare Kiosk System Software, creating a video conferencing kiosk solution.

On May 15, 2019 it was announced that Vidyo, Inc. was acquired by Enghouse Systems Limited (TSX:ENGH) for a purchase price of approximately $40 million. Vidyo's current annual revenue is approximately $60 million.

== Products ==
Video-chat service for Nintendo's Wii U game console was co-developed with Vidyo, Nintendo European Research & Development and Nintendo Software and Nintendo Software Technology. VidyoRouter is an appliance that performs the packet-switching function. The VidyoPortal is a Web-based environment used to access and manage the VidyoConferencing system and accounts from anywhere with internet access. VidyoDesktop is a software-based endpoint, managed via VidyoPortal, able to support HD quality video. HD-200 is a High Definition room system endpoint. The HD-100 is an entry-level High Definition room system endpoint. Both of these products are managed by the VidyoPortal and interoperate with VidyoDesktop users.

VidyoGateway is an appliance used to connect legacy video conferencing systems with the VidyoConferencing network. The VidyoCampus Program is used by colleges and universities to deploy the system to every desktop throughout their collaboration community. VidyoHealth is a scalable high-definition telemedicine product that uses the public Internet and existing general purpose IP networks at medical facilities for doctor-patient and doctor-doctor interactions.
