= Open Patent Alliance =

The Open Patent Alliance is a patent pool that was announced on June 9, 2008, for owners and claimants of patents and intellectual property related to the WiMAX standard. The inaugural members include Alcatel-Lucent, Cisco Systems, Clearwire, Intel, Samsung, and Sprint. Owners and claimants who have not joined the alliance include Wi-LAN and Qualcomm.
