= Context-adaptive variable-length coding =

Context-adaptive variable-length coding (CAVLC) is a form of entropy coding used in H.264/MPEG-4 AVC video encoding. It is an inherently lossless compression technique, like almost all entropy-coders. In H.264/MPEG-4 AVC, it is used to encode residual, zig-zag order, blocks of transform coefficients. It is an alternative to context-adaptive binary arithmetic coding (CABAC). CAVLC requires considerably less processing to decode than CABAC, although it does not compress the data quite as effectively. CAVLC is supported in all H.264 profiles, unlike CABAC which is not supported in Baseline and Extended profiles.

CAVLC is used to encode residual, zig-zag ordered 4×4 (and 2×2) blocks of transform coefficients. CAVLC is designed to take advantage of several characteristics of quantized 4×4 blocks:

- After prediction, transformation and quantization, blocks are typically sparse (containing mostly zeros).
- The highest non-zero coefficients after zig-zag scan are often sequences of +/− 1. CAVLC signals the number of high-frequency +/−1 coefficients in a compact way.
- The number of non-zero coefficients in neighbouring blocks is correlated. The number of coefficients is encoded using a look-up table; the choice of look-up table depends on the number of non-zero coefficients in neighbouring blocks.
- The level (magnitude) of non-zero coefficients tends to be higher at the start of the reordered array (near the DC coefficient) and lower towards the higher frequencies. CAVLC takes advantage of this by adapting the choice of VLC look-up table for the "level" parameter depending on recently coded level magnitudes.

== Coded elements ==
Parameters that are required to be encoded and transmitted include the following table:

| Parameters | Description |
|---|---|
| Macroblock type | Prediction method for each coded macroblock |
| Coded block pattern | Indicates which blocks within a macroblock contain coded coefficients |
| Quantizer parameter reference frame | Transmitted as a delta value from the previous value of QP |
| Reference frame index | Identify reference frame(s) for inter prediction |
| Motion vector | Transmitted as a difference (mvd) from predicted motion vector |
| Residual data | Coefficient data for each 4×4 or 2×2 block |

== CAVLC examples ==
| Element | Value | Code |
|---|---|---|
| coeff_token | TotalCoeffs=5, T1s=3 | 0000100 |
| T1 sign (4) | + | 0 |
| T1 sign (3) | - | 1 |
| T1 sign (2) | - | 1 |
| Level (1) | +1 (use Level_VLC0) | 1 |
| Level (0) | +3 (use Level_VLC1) | 0010 |
| TotalZeros | 3 | 111 |
| run_before(4) | ZerosLeft=3; run_before=1 | 10 |
| run_before(3) | ZerosLeft=2; run_before=0 | 1 |
| run_before(2) | ZerosLeft=2; run_before=0 | 1 |
| run_before(1) | ZerosLeft=2; run_before=1 | 01 |
| run_before(0) | ZerosLeft=1; run_before=1 | No code required; last coefficient. |

| Code | Element | Value | Output array |
|---|---|---|---|
| 0000100 | coeff_token | Total Coeffs=5, T1s=3 | Empty |
| 0 | T1 sign | + | 1 |
| 1 | T1 sign | - | −1, 1 |
| 1 | T1 sign | - | −1, −1, 1 |
| 1 | Level | +1 | 1, −1, −1, 1 |
| 0010 | Level | +3 | 3, 1, −1, −1, 1 |
| 111 | TotalZeros | 3 | 3, 1, −1, −1, 1 |
| 10 | run_before | 1 | 3, 1, −1, −1, 0, 1 |
| 1 | run_before | 0 | 3, 1, −1, −1, 0, 1 |
| 1 | run_before | 0 | 3, 1, −1, −1, 0, 1 |
| 01 | run_before | 1 | 3, 0, 1, −1, −1, 0, 1 |

In all following examples, we assume that table Num-VLC0 is used to encode coeff_token.

0, 3, 0, 1, −1, −1, 0, 1, 0… TotalCoeffs = 5 (indexed from highest frequency [4] to lowest frequency [0])

TotalZeros = 3

T1s = 3 (in fact there are 4 trailing ones but only 3 can be encoded as a "special case")

Encoding:

The transmitted bitstream for this block is 000010001110010111101101.

Decoding: The output array is "built up" from the decoded values as shown below. Values added to the output array at each stage are underlined.

The decoder has inserted two zeros; however, TotalZeros is equal to 3 and so another 1 zero is inserted before the lowest coefficient, making the final output array: 0, 3, 0, 1, −1, −1, 0, 1

== See also ==
- H.264 (entropy coding)
- Data compression
- Lossless compression
