= Patent pool =

Consortium in patent law

In patent law, a patent pool is a consortium of two or more companies agreeing to cross-license patents relating to a particular technology. The creation of a patent pool can save patentees and licensees time and money, and, in case of blocking patents, it may also be the only reasonable method for making the invention available to the public. Competition law issues are usually important when a large consortium is formed.

== History ==
In 1856, sewing machine manufacturers Grover & Baker, Singer, and Wheeler & Wilson, all accusing each other of patent infringement, met in Albany, New York to pursue their suits. Orlando B. Potter, a lawyer and president of Grover & Baker, proposed that, rather than squander their profits on litigation, they pool their patents. This was the first patent pool, a process which enables the production of complicated machines without legal battles over patent rights.

In 1917, the two major patent holders for airplanes, the Wright Company and the Curtiss Company, had effectively blocked the building of new airplanes, which were desperately needed as the United States was entering World War I. The U.S. government, as a result of a recommendation of a committee formed by Franklin D. Roosevelt, then Assistant Secretary of the Navy, pressured the industry to form a patent pool, the Manufacturer's Aircraft Association.

A similar system of cross-licensing developed in the early radio industry. Agreements among General Electric, Westinghouse, AT&T, and the Radio Corporation of America (RCA) consolidated many key wireless patents and strongly influenced which companies could manufacture radio equipment during the 1920s; see Patents and licensing in early radio.

In August 2005, a patent pool was formed by about 20 companies active in the Radio Frequency Identification (RFID) domain. The RFID Consortium picked Via Licensing to administer its patent pool in September 2006.

== Risk mitigation ==
As in these examples many industries could not function without patent pools since the coordination costs (risk, negotiation, etc.) would otherwise be too high. Patent pools are only one example of cases where members of an otherwise competitive industry join in common cause to create some resource that is to their collective benefit. For example, the insurance industry pools claims data to collectively reduce risk; the catalog sales industry pools sales data to better model their customers; the auto industry collaborates to standardize components; and in the software industry some companies actively contribute to open-source projects.

Patent pools do not eliminate risk, they only temper it. Patent holders (including other patent pools) outside the pool can still create cost and risk for the industry. While it is rare for a patent pool to indemnify licensees, a pool does help to assure a common interest will emerge should one member be accused of infringement by a third party. Flaws in the design of the pool's governance can create the risk that one member can break the common cause of the group. Examples of well-known such cases include the MPEG-2, MPEG-4 Part 2 and H.264 video coding standards, and the DVD6C pool. The MPEG-2 patent pool has also been criticized because by 2015 more than 90% of the MPEG-2 patents will have expired but as long as there are one or more active patents in the MPEG-2 patent pool in either the country of manufacture or the country of sale the MPEG-2 license agreement requires that licensees pay a license fee that does not change based on the number of patents that have expired.

== National jurisdictions ==
=== United States ===
Since the 1990s, patent pools have been viewed by U.S. regulatory authorities in a positive light. In 1995, the U.S. Department of Justice (DOJ) and U.S. Federal Trade Commission (FTC) released the “Antitrust Guidelines for the Licensing of Intellectual Property” which stated that the pooling of patents may have “…pro-competitive benefits”. The Antitrust Division of the DOJ later issued a letter in support of the MPEG-2 pool. However, stipulations exist to ensure pools do not function anti-competitively. As required by the DOJ, patents in the pool must be essential, non-substitutable and the owners must maintain the right to individually license their patents. In addition, the DOJ may monitor the royalty rates collected by the firm.

== See also ==
- Avanci, an operator of patent licensing platforms established in 2016
- Essential patent
- Open Invention Network
- Open Patent Alliance
- Patent map
- Patent portfolio
- Patent thicket
- Sherman Antitrust Act
- 501(c)(6) — i.e. industry specific nonprofits
- Patent holding company
- MPEG LA
- Tragedy of the anticommons
- United States v. Glaxo Group Ltd. (1973)
- The Wright brothers patent war
- Reasonable and non-discriminatory licensing
