= Avanci =

Operator of patent licensing platforms

- Company type: Private
- Industry: Patent licensing
- Founded: 2016; 10 years ago
- Founder: Kasim Alfalahi
- Headquarters: Dallas, Texas
- Website: avanci.com

Avanci is an operator of patent licensing platforms established in 2016 in the information and communications technology (ICT) space and more specifically in the Internet of things (IoT) and broadcast spaces. By licensing patents from multiple holders under a single agreement, Avanci provides licenses to standardized technologies for manufacturers in the IoT and broadcast industries. The company is based in Dallas, Texas, operating through offices in Dublin, Beijing, Tokyo, and Seoul.

As of 2023, Avanci has 57 patent holders in its Avanci 4G Vehicle marketplace licensing their portfolios of eCall, 2G, 3G, and 4G standard essential patents and 61 licensors in its Avanci 5G Vehicle marketplace licensing their 2G, 3G, 4G and 5G standard essential patents. The company has estimated that almost 80-85% of connected cars are under the Avanci license. Patent holders on Avanci's platforms include Ericsson, InterDigital, Nokia, Qualcomm and Sharp. The company also has over 80 auto brands under license across its platforms, including Audi, BMW, Ford, General Motors, Honda, Mercedes-Benz, Nissan, Porsche, Renault, Stellantis, Toyota, Volkswagen and Volvo, and its licenses cover over 130 million vehicles.

In 2023, Avanci launched Avanci Aftermarket, a licensing program for vehicle aftermarket products, as well as Avanci Broadcast, a service focused on ATSC 3.0 broadcast technologies.

== History ==
Avanci was founded in 2016 by Kasim Alfalahi, the former Chief Intellectual Property Officer at Ericsson. Ericsson was one of the first patent holders to join the Avanci Vehicle marketplace, along with InterDigital, KPN, Qualcomm and ZTE. Later in 2016, Sony joined as well.

In 2017, BMW became the first automaker to sign a license agreement with Avanci, followed by Volvo, Audi, Porsche and Volkswagen. By 2018, twenty patent holders had agreed to license their patents through the platform, including Conversant, NTT Docomo and Nokia. In 2021, Daimler AG and Jaguar Land Rover joined the platform as licensees. In 2022, General Motors and Ford entered licensing deals with Avanci while LG Electronics and Pantech joined the platform as licensors. In September 2022, Honda, Nissan and Toyota signed licensing deals with Avanci, marking the first Japanese automakers to sign with the company.

In July 2020, the U.S. Department of Justice's Antitrust Division reviewed the proposed platform and concluded that the platform was unlikely to harm competition due to its fair, reasonable and nondiscriminatory (FRAND) rates and safeguards in place to protect competition.

In August 2022, Avanci hired Marianne Frydenlund from Nordic Semiconductor to lead the creation of new licensing programs for other IoT sectors. Hyundai and Kia also signed licensing deals later that month.

In a 2023 article published in the Journal of Intellectual Property Law & Practice, authors Dr. Manveen Singh and Dr. Vishwas H. Devaiah note that standard essential patent licensing in the automotive sector has progressed in large part due to widespread industry participation in the Avanci platform as a one-stop shop for such licenses. The authors also point out that Avanci's model has found favor with courts and regulatory bodies in the U.S. and Europe.

In February 2023, Avanci began offering cellular patent licensing for connected products installed in vehicles after their original sale via the Avanci Aftermarket program. The platform launched with over 40 patent holders, including Ericsson, InterDigital, and Qualcomm, licensing technologies for use in products such as entertainment units, tracking devices in containers, information systems for public transport, and connected devices in road toll stations.

In March 2023, Avanci launched Avanci Broadcast, a patent licensing platform for the ATSC 3.0 broadcast standard, which was developed by the Advanced Television Systems Committee and has been adopted for over-the-air TV broadcasts in the United States, Canada, Mexico, South Korea and Jamaica, among other countries. Avanci Broadcast launched with more than 70% of all ATSC 3.0 declared patent families on the platform from patent holders ETRI, LG Electronics, ONE Media, Panasonic, Samsung Electronics, Sharp and Sun Patent Trust, and includes device manufacturers that have shipped the vast majority of televisions using the ATSC 3.0 standard. In August 2023, Avanci Broadcast signed its first licensees, Atlanta DTH and ZapperBox.

In April 2023, Samsung joined the Avanci Vehicle 4G licensing program, the company’s first inclusion in a collective licensing platform. In June 2023, Avanci won "Global Patent License Provider of the Year" at the 18th annual Managing IP Awards.

In September 2023, Avanci launched its 5G program for connected vehicles, which through a single license provides access to patented technologies essential for 5G, 4G, 3G, and 2G connectivity. The patented technologies include those necessary for vehicle-to-everything (C-V2X) connectivity, which enables vehicles to communicate with other smart-enabled vehicles and transportation infrastructure, as well as cyclists and pedestrians. The program launched with 58 licensors. Mercedes-Benz was the first licensee, followed shortly by BMW. Additionally, it was announced in September 2023 that Huawei had joined the Avanci 4G and 5G Vehicle programs.

== Leadership ==
Kasim Alfalahi is the founder and CEO of Avanci. Prior to Avanci, Alfalahi was Ericsson’s Chief Intellectual Property Officer, where in 2015 patent licensing generated $1.7 billion in revenue. After more than 20 years with Ericsson, he left the company to address concerns about unpredictability and uncertainty in licensing fees through the founding of Avanci. In 2022, Alfalahi was named one of the "50 most influential people in IP" by intellectual property publication Managing IP due to Avanci's growth in the automotive patent licensing space. In March 2023, Intellectual Asset Management ranked CEO Kasim Alfalahi number one on its Market Makers 2022 list, which recognizes influential leaders in the patent licensing space, due to the significant number of automakers that joined Avanci Vehicle in 2022. Alfalahi is also a Board Member of St. Mark's School of Texas and the University of Texas Southwestern Medical Center.
