= Thor (video codec) =

Royalty-free video codec

- Developed by: Cisco Systems
- Type of format: Video codec
- Extended to: NETVC, AV1
- Open format?: Yes
- Free format?: Yes
- Website: https://github.com/cisco/thor

Thor is a royalty-free video codec under development by Cisco Systems. The specifications of Thor were available in various Internet Drafts.

On July 22, 2015, Thor was presented to the IETF as a candidate for their NETVC video standard. Thor uses some Cisco elements that are also used by HEVC. As part of the NETVC work, the Constrained Low-Pass Filter (CLPF) and motion compensation techniques used in Thor were tested in conjunction with the lapped transform coding techniques from the Daala codec.

On September 1, 2015, Cisco announced that the Alliance for Open Media would use elements of Thor to develop a royalty free video format, AOMedia Video 1.

According to Steinar Midtskogen, a principal Thor developer and AV1 contributor, Thor is in good shape for real-time CPU encoding (as of NETVC meeting 101, March 19, 2018), in strong contrast to AV1 at the same time. Thor development had stalled for the finalization of AV1, but Midtskogen envisaged further Thor development by merging the Daala entropy coder and adding more tools for screen content.
