= High Efficiency Video Coding tiers and levels =

High Efficiency Video Coding tiers and levels are constraints that define a High Efficiency Video Coding (HEVC) bitstream in terms of maximum bit rate, maximum luma sample rate, maximum luma picture size, minimum compression ratio, maximum number of slices allowed, and maximum number of tiles allowed. Lower tiers are more constrained than higher tiers and lower levels are more constrained than higher levels.

== Tiers ==
The HEVC standard defines two tiers: Main and High. The Main tier is a lower tier than the High tier. The tiers were made to deal with applications that differ in terms of their maximum bit rate. The Main tier was designed for most applications while the High tier was designed for very demanding applications.

== Levels ==
The HEVC standard defines thirteen levels. A level is a set of constraints for a bitstream. For levels below level 4 only the Main tier is allowed. A decoder that conforms to a given tier/level is required to be capable of decoding all bitstreams that are encoded for that tier/level and for all lower tiers/levels.

Tiers and levels with maximum property values
Level	Max luma sample rate (samples/s)	Max luma picture size (samples)	Max bit rate for Main and Main 10 profiles (1000bit/s)^{[A]}		Max bit rate for Main 12 profile (1000bit/s)		Max bit rate for Main 4:4:4 12 profile (1000bit/s)		Max bit rate for Main 4:4:4 16 Intra profile (1000bit/s)		Max bit rate for High Throughput 4:4:4 16 Intra profile (1000bit/s)		Example picture resolution @ highest frame rate^{[B]} (MaxDpbSize^{[C]}) Click here to hide/show additional examples	MinCR^{[D]}	Max number of slice segments per picture^{[E]}	Max number of tile^{[F]}	
Level	Max luma sample rate (samples/s)	Max luma picture size (samples)	Main tier	High tier	Main tier	High tier	Main tier	High tier	Main tier	High tier	Main tier	High tier	Example picture resolution @ highest frame rate^{[B]} (MaxDpbSize^{[C]}) Click here to hide/show additional examples	MinCR^{[D]}	Max number of slice segments per picture^{[E]}	rows	columns
1	552,960	36,864	128	-	192	-	384	-	1,024	-	12,288	-	128×96@33.7 (6) 176×144@15.0 (6)	2	16	1	1
2	3,686,400	122,880	1,500	-	2,250	-	4,500	-	12,000	-	144,000	-	176×144@100.0 (16); 320×240@45.0 (6); 352×240@37.5 (6) 352×288@30.0 (6)	2	16	1	1
2.1	7,372,800	245,760	3,000	-	4,500	-	9,000	-	24,000	-	288,000	-	320×240@90.0 (12); 352×240@75.0 (12); 352×288@60.0 (12); 352×480@37.5 (6); 352×576@33.3 (6) 640×360@30.0 (6)	2	20	1	1
3	16,588,800	552,960	6,000	-	9,000	-	18,000	-	48,000	-	576,000	-	352×480@84.3 (12); 352×576@75.0 (12); 640×360@67.5 (12); 720×480@42.1 (8); 720×576@37.5 (8) 960×540@30.0 (6)	2	30	2	2
3.1	33,177,600	983,040	10,000	-	15,000	-	30,000	-	80,000	-	960,000	-	720×480@84.3 (12); 720×576@75.0 (12); 960×540@60.0 (8) 1280×720@33.7 (6)	2	40	3	3
4	66,846,720	2,228,224	12,000	30,000	18,000	45,000	36,000	90,000	96,000	240,000	1,152,000	2,880,000	1,280×720@68.0 (12); 1,920×1,080@32.0 (6) 2,048×1,080@30.0 (6)	4	75	5	5
4.1	133,693,440	2,228,224	20,000	50,000	30,000	75,000	60,000	150,000	160,000	400,000	1,920,000	4,800,000	1,280×720@136.0 (12); 1,920×1,080@64.0 (6) 2,048×1,080@60.0 (6)	4	75	5	5
5	267,386,880	8,912,896	25,000	100,000	37,500	150,000	75,000	300,000	200,000	800,000	2,400,000	9,600,000	1,920×1,080@128.0 (16); 2,048×1,080@120.0 (16); 3,840×2,160@32.0 (6) 4,096×2,160@30.0 (6)	6	200	11	10
5.1	534,773,760	8,912,896	40,000	160,000	60,000	240,000	120,000	480,000	320,000	1,280,000	3,840,000	15,360,000	1,920×1,080@256.0 (16); 2,048×1,080@240.0 (16); 3,840×2,160@64.0 (6) 4,096×2,160@60.0 (6)	8	200	11	10
5.2	1,069,547,520	8,912,896	60,000	240,000	90,000	360,000	180,000	720,000	480,000	1,920,000	5,760,000	23,040,000	1,920×1,080@300.0 (16); 2,048×1,080@300.0 (16); 3,840×2,160@128.0 (6) 4,096×2,160@120.0 (6)	8	200	11	10
6	1,069,547,520	35,651,584	60,000	240,000	90,000	360,000	180,000	720,000	480,000	1,920,000	5,760,000	23,040,000	3,840×2,160@128.0 (16); 4,096×2,160@120.0 (16); 7,680×4,320@32.0 (6) 8,192×4,320@30.0 (6)	8	600	22	20
6.1	2,139,095,040	35,651,584	120,000	480,000	180,000	720,000	360,000	1,440,000	960,000	3,840,000	11,520,000	46,080,000	3,840×2,160@256.0 (16); 4,096×2,160@240.0 (16); 7,680×4,320@64.0 (6) 8,192×4,320@60.0 (6)	8	600	22	20
6.2	4,278,190,080	35,651,584	240,000	800,000	360,000	1,200,000	720,000	2,400,000	1,920,000	6,400,000	23,040,000	76,800,000	3,840×2,160@300.0 (16); 4,096×2,160@300.0 (16); 7,680×4,320@128.0 (6) 8,192×4,320@120.0 (6)	6	600	22	20

^{A} The maximum bit rate of the profile is based on the combination of bit depth, chroma sampling, and the type of profile. For bit depth the maximum bit rate increases by 1.5x for 12-bit profiles and 2x for 16-bit profiles. For chroma sampling the maximum bit rate increases by 1.5x for 4:2:2 profiles and 2x for 4:4:4 profiles. For the Intra profiles the maximum bit rate increases by 2x.
^{B} The maximum frame rate supported by HEVC is 300 frames per second (fps).
^{C} The MaxDpbSize, maximum number of pictures in the decoded picture buffer, for the maximum luma picture size of that level is 6 for all levels. The MaxDpbSize can increase to a maximum of 16 frames, if the luma picture size of the video is smaller than the maximum luma picture size of that level, in incremental steps of 4/3×, 2×, or 4×.
^{D} The MinCR, minimum compression ratio, for that level. The MinCR constraint is reduced to half its base value for the 4:2:2 and 4:4:4 chroma sampling profiles and is reduced by an additional half for the Intra profiles. The MinCR is reduced to 1/24th of its base value with the High Throughput 4:4:4 16 Intra profile.
^{E} The maximum number of slice segments is the number of slices allowed per picture at both the maximum resolution and maximum frame rate.
^{F} The maximum number of tiles allowed per picture. The maximum number of tiles allowed per second is the maximum number of tiles allowed per picture times 120.

== See also ==
- High Efficiency Video Coding
- UHDTV - Digital video formats with resolutions of 4K (3840×2160) and 8K (7680×4320)
- Rec. 2020 - ITU-R Recommendation for UHDTV
- H.264/MPEG-4 AVC - The predecessor video standard of HEVC
- VC-1 - A video standard developed by Microsoft
