= Alliance for Open Media =

Non-profit industry consortium

- Abbreviation: AOMedia, AOM
- Formation: September 1, 2015; 11 years ago
- Founder: Amazon, Cisco, Google, Intel, Microsoft, Mozilla, Netflix
- Type: Industry consortium
- Purpose: Development of a royalty-free video format
- Headquarters: Wakefield, Massachusetts, U.S.
- Products: AOMedia Video (AV2); AOMedia Video (AV1); AV1 Image File Format (AVIF); IAMF
- Members: 53 (2021)
- Parent organization: Joint Development Foundation
- Website: aomedia.org

The Alliance for Open Media (AOMedia) is a non-profit industry consortium headquartered in Wakefield, Massachusetts, and formed to develop open, royalty-free technology for multimedia delivery. It uses the ideas and principles of open web standard development to create video standards that can serve as alternatives to the hitherto dominant standards of the Moving Picture Experts Group (MPEG).

Its first project was to develop AV1, a new open video codec and format, as a successor to VP9 and an alternative to HEVC. AV1 uses elements from Daala, Thor, and VP10, three preceding open video codecs.

The governing members of the Alliance for Open Media are Amazon, Apple, Cisco, Google, Intel, Meta Platforms, Microsoft, Mozilla, Netflix, Nvidia, Samsung Electronics and Tencent.

== History ==
Some collaboration and work that would later be merged into AV1 predates the official launch of the Alliance.

Following the successful standardization of an audio standard in the Internet Engineering Task Force (IETF) in 2012, a working group for the standardization of a royalty-free video format began to form under the lead of members of the Xiph.Org Foundation, who had begun working on their experimental video format Daala back in 2010. In May 2015, the Internet Video Codec working group (NetVC) of the IETF was officially started and presented with coding techniques from Daala. Cisco Systems joined forces and offered their own prototype format Thor to the working group on July 22.

The lack of a suitable video format for inclusion in the specification of HTML video by the World Wide Web Consortium (W3C) and the failed negotiations for one mandatory video format for WebRTC showed the need for a competitive, open video standard.

The emergence of a second patent pool for HEVC (HEVC Advance) in spring 2015 provided motivation for investments in an alternative video format and grew support for the Alliance, mainly due to the uncertainty regarding royalties for MPEG's next-generation video format, HEVC.

On September 1, 2015, the Alliance for Open Media was announced with the goal of developing a royalty-free video format as an alternative to licensed formats such as H.264 and HEVC. The founding members are Amazon, Cisco, Google, Intel, Microsoft, Mozilla, and Netflix. The plan was to release the video format by 2017.

The alliance saw expansion of its member list since inception. On April 5, 2016, the Alliance for Open Media announced that AMD, ARM, and Nvidia had joined, and Adobe, Ateme, Ittiam and Vidyo joined in the months following. On November 13, 2017, Facebook later joined as a governing member. In January 2018 the alliance's website was quietly updated to add Apple as a governing member of the alliance. On April 3, 2019, Samsung Electronics joined as a governing member. October 1, 2019, Tencent joined as a governing member.

In 2018, the founder and chairman of the MPEG acknowledged the Alliance to be the biggest threat to their business model, furthermore stating that:

Alliance for Open Media has occupied the void created by MPEG’s outdated video compression standard (AVC), absence of competitive [royalty free] standards (IVC) and unusable modern standard (HEVC)... Everybody realises that the old MPEG business model is now broke.

— Leonardo Chiariglione, A crisis, the causes and a solution

=== 2022 ===
Articles suggested that Google was in planning to release 2 open formats, High-dynamic-range video/HDR video and 3D audio, as alternatives to Dolby Atmos and Dolby Vision video technology. A draft called IAC has been developed for audio, and Samsung's HDR10+ will not be utilized. During September 2022, AOMedia announced Project Caviar. Although the name is yet to be disclosed, the announcement was made public through a journal authored by AOMedia developers and biographies shared on the doc: and after a month papers calls were released with an early draft. The Video Codec Working Group (CWG) was the first AOMedia technical group. Recognizing some needs, AOMedia created, in February 2022, the Volumetric Visual Media Working Group (VVMWG). In June 2022, 10 universities and 24 organizations (companies) went to Alliance for Open Media Symposium, with various engineers working on AV1 and developing the new technologies in the cwg incubators gains test for the Next Generation AOM standard. There are in the alliance efforts done through different working groups. AVM: AOM Video Model - was created in the AOMedia GitLab repository. It consists of tools based on research candidate. AVM is the software codebase that AOMedia is using for its research and development of the next generation video coding technologies. The development happens in stages, and each new anchor is the codebase in which previously adopted experiments have been integrated and which is used in the following round of the experiments. - this repo based on Libaom, reference encoder for AV1 format.

=== 2023 ===
During June 2023, AOMedia announced that Zoom Video Communications would become a promoter member.

== AOMedia Video ==
AOMedia's first project was the creation of an open video compression format and codec optimized for streaming media over the internet, intended for both commercial and non-commercial content, including user-generated content. The format is intended to be the first in a line of new, AOMedia Video (AV) formats being developed.

AOMedia planned for the first version of its format (AV1) to be completed before the end of 2017. However, work on the bitstream specification will be continued into 2018. The format is the primary contender for standardisation by the video coding standard working group NetVC of the Internet Engineering Task Force (IETF).

The main distinguishing features of AV1 are its purported royalty-free licensing terms and performance. AV1 is specifically designed for real-time applications and for higher resolutions than typical usage scenarios of the current generation (H.264) of video formats.

In 2019, Sisvel International formed a patent pool for selling licenses to intellectual property it anticipates will be necessary to comply with the AV1 standard. AOMedia said this was contrary to its goal of a standard developed entirely with free, donated technology owned by the organization. Sisvel anticipates AV1 will require patented technology developed outside the AOMedia member organizations.

== AOMedia Audio ==
IAMF in 2023

In November 2023 IAMF (Immersive Audio Model and Formats) was announced. In October 2025 the Eclipsa Audio was announced. In February 2026 Open Audio Codec (OAC) had started development, based on the Opus source code and intended to be its successor.

== Operation and structure ==
The Alliance is incorporated in the US as a tax-exempt non-profit organization and a subsidiary "project" of the independent Joint Development Foundation (JDF), also headquartered in Wakefield.

The Alliance intends to release new video codecs as free software under the BSD 2-Clause License. It adopted the patent rules of the W3C which mandate technology contributors to disclose all patents that may be relevant and to agree to a royalty-free patent license. Its current stated software release M.O. is to do so under a combination of the following licenses: BSD 3-Clause Clear License, Alliance for Open Media Patent License 1.0, and AOM Statement relating to AOM Patent License 1.0. On 16 November 2021, the second's requirements of users were criticized by R&D-intensive organisation coalition IP Europe as creating a "lock-in" effect. On 7 July 2022, it was revealed that the European Union's antitrust regulators had opened an investigation into the Alliance and its licensing policy. It said this action may be restricting the innovators' ability to compete with the AV1 technical specification, and may eliminate incentives for them to innovate.

The Commission has information that AOM and its members may be imposing licensing terms (mandatory royalty-free cross licensing) on innovators that were not a part of AOM at the time of the creation of the AV1 technical, but whose patents are deemed essential to (its) technical specifications

On 23 May 2023, the European Commission decided to close the investigation while taking no further action. But in an email they reiterated that the closure does not constitute a finding of compliance or non-compliance with EU antitrust laws. The Alliance's patent license contains a defensive termination clause to discourage patent lawsuits.

Software development happens in the open using a public source code repository and issue tracking system, and welcomes contributions from the general public. Contributions have to pass internal reviews and gain consensus for their adoption. Different sub-groups inside the Alliance handle testing, reviews for IPR/patent problems hardware-friendliness, and editing of specification documents.

There are two levels of membership: organizations can join as an ordinary member, or as a governing member with a seat on the board of directors. Confusingly, these are dubbed "founding members" in AOM terminology, although they need not be members since the Alliance was founded.

There is a broad representation of the video industry among the Alliance members, featuring several hardware, software, and content producers, OTT video distributors, providers of real-time conferencing solutions, and browser vendors. Several AOM members have previously worked on MPEG's HEVC and hold patents to it (e.g. BBC, Intel, Cisco, Vidyo, Apple, Microsoft, and Broadcom).

=== Governing members ===
As of October 2025:

- Amazon
- Apple
- Cisco
- Google
- Intel
- Meta
- Microsoft
- Mozilla
- Netflix
- Nvidia
- Samsung
- Tencent

=== General members ===
As of November 2023:

- Adobe
- Agora.io
- Alibaba
- Allegro DVT
- AMD
- Amlogic
- Argon Design
- Ateme
- BBC Research & Development
- Beijing Kingsoft Cloud Internet Technology
- Bilibili
- Bitmovin
- Broadcom
- CableLabs
- Chips&Media
- Cosmo Software
- Gfycat
- Hulu
- iQIYI
- iSIZE
- Ittiam
- LG Electronics
- NETINT Technologies
- NGCodec
- Oppo
- Polycom
- Realtek
- Sigma Designs
- Snap Inc.
- Socionext
- Synamedia
- THX
- University of York
- V-Silicon
- VeriSilicon
- ViCue Soft
- VideoLAN
- Vidyo
- Vimeo
- Vivo
- Visionular
- Western Digital
- Xilinx
- Zoom

=== Previous members ===
- IBM (previously a Founding/Governing member, but delisted from website as of July 7, 2020)

== See also ==
- List of free and open-source software organizations
