= AV2 =

Open, royalty-free video coding format

AOMedia Video 2
- Developed by: Alliance for Open Media
- Initial release: 28 May 2026 (5 months ago)
- Latest release: 1.0.0; 28 May 2026 (5 months ago)
- Type of format: Video coding format
- Extended from: AV1
- Standard: AV2 Bitstream & Decoding Process Specification
- Open format?: Yes
- Free format?: See § Patent claims
- Website: av2.aomedia.org

AOMedia Video 2 (AV2) is an open, royalty-free video coding format developed by the Alliance for Open Media, a non-profit technology development consortium. It is the successor to their existing and widely deployed AV1 encoding format, and is designed to deliver better compression performance, enhanced support for AR, VR and split-screen usage and support for a wider visual quality range.

AV2 development work started in 2020, two years after the release of AV1. It was released on 28 May 2026.

AV2 uses an overall encoding framework that is similar to that of AV1, but with significant innovations in every part of that framework. These include extended recursive partitioning, changes to transform block partitioning, semi-decoupled partitioning of luma and chroma, improvements to intra-frame prediction including chroma from luma, and new modes for inter-frame prediction.

The Alliance for Open Media previously stated that AV2 will formally be released at the end of 2025, with hardware implementations expected in 2026. At CES 2026, VLC 4.0 was demonstrated playing AV2 on a MacBook Pro. On 9 June 2026 they announced AV2 in a blog post.

AV2 will compete with the royalty-based format VVC for adoption in the market, in a way similar to the competition between the earlier generation HEVC and AV1 formats. As of 2025, prototype AV2 implementations show around 30% lower bitrate over AV1 at similar visual quality, and AV2 is expected to offer similar performance to VVC overall.

== Adoption ==
=== Hardware ===
Company	Chip/architecture	Type	Throughput	Ref
Allegro DVT	Pulsar D400	Decoder IP core	8K	
Chips&Media	WAVE63F1	Decoder IP core	8K@30fps	
VeriSilicon	VC9800D	Decoder	8K@30fps (single-core) and 8K@60fps (dual-core)	

=== Software ===
- AVM (AOM Video Model) – reference software for AV2 format from Alliance for Open Media
- dav2d – AV2 decoder developed by VideoLAN targeted to be small, portable and very fast
- SVT-AV2 – encoder planned by Intel, following its SVT-AV1 encoder

=== Web browsers and streaming ===
At CES 2026, Google demonstrated AV2 playback in Chrome, streaming video from YouTube at 1080p and 24 frames per second on a consumer gaming laptop, using a custom browser build with the libavm reference decoder. In October 2026, Google stated it was working on native AV2 support in Chrome, and YouTube said AV2 streams would be available on the web "as soon as early 2027". The same month, an AV2 decoder for Chrome desktop builds on Windows, macOS and Linux was proposed on Chrome Platform Status, and initial work on a decoder based on dav2d began in Chromium. Netflix, Prime Video and Meta have also expressed interest in the format.

== Patent claims ==
The Luxembourg-based non-practicing entity Sisvel announced plans in December 2025 to establish a patent pool, six months before AV2 was released, as it did for AV1.
