= NETVC =

Planned royalty-free video codec

NETVC was the name given to a planned royalty-free video codec that was intended to be developed in the former Internet Video Codec working group of the IETF. It was intended to provide a royalty-free alternative to industry standards such as H.264/AVC and HEVC that have required licensing payments for many uses. The chairs of the working group were Matthew Miller of Outer Planes and Mo Zanaty of Cisco. A list of criteria to be met by the new video standard was produced in April 2020 as Informational RFC 8761, and the working group was closed.

== Concept ==
The October 2015 basic draft requirements for NETVC were support for a bit depth of 8-bits to 10-bits per sample, 4:2:0 chroma subsampling, 4:4:4 YUV, low coding delay capability, feasible real time decoder/encoder software implementations, temporal scalability, and error resilience tools. The October 2015 optional draft requirements for NETVC included support for a bit depth of up to 16-bits per sample, 4:2:2 chroma subsampling, RGB video, auxiliary channel planes, high dynamic range, and parallel processing tools.

== History ==
On March 24, 2015, Xiph.org's Daala codec was presented to the IETF as a candidate for NETVC. Daala coding techniques have been proposed to the IETF for inclusion into NETVC.

On July 22, 2015, Cisco's Thor video codec was presented to the IETF as a candidate for their NETVC video standard. Thor is being developed by Cisco Systems and uses some Cisco elements that are also used by HEVC. The Constrained Low-Pass Filter (CLPF) and motion compensation that are used in Thor were tested with Daala.

As of July 2015, in addition to Xiph and Cisco, there were also other participants involved in the project.

At IETF meeting 101 in March 2018, xvc was presented by Divideon as another candidate. Thor developer Steinar Midtskogen confirmed that a subset of xvc that Divideon considered royalty-free had better compression than Thor at comparable complexity settings. It was agreed at that time to pause physical meetings of the working group to see how the market for royalty-free video formats further developed, given that the teams behind several of the format candidates that had been presented had chosen to join the AV1 standard development initiative of the Alliance for Open Media consortium, which had similar goals.

After publishing RFC 8761 "Video Codec Requirements and Evaluation Methodology" in April 2020, the Internet Video Codec working group was closed.

== Schedule ==
The planned schedule for the development of NETVC was:

- April 2018: Informational document on requirements and evaluation criteria.
- July 2018: Informational document on test results, initial codec specification and reference implementation.
- December 2018: Standards documents on codec specification and storage format specification.
