= IEEE Transactions on Circuits and Systems for Video Technology =

Peer-reviewed video technology journal

- Discipline: Computer science, electrical engineering
- Language: English
- Edited by: Shan Liu

Publication details
- History: 1991–present
- Publisher: IEEE Circuits and Systems Society
- Frequency: Monthly
- Impact factor: 11.1 (2025)

Standard abbreviations
- ISO 4: IEEE Trans. Circuits Syst. Video Technol.

Indexing
- ISSN: 1051-8215 (print); 1558-2205 (web)
- LCCN: 91642188
- OCLC no.: 22134460

Links
- Journal homepage; Online access

IEEE Transactions on Circuits and Systems for Video Technology (TCSVT) is a monthly peer-reviewed academic journal published by the IEEE Circuits and Systems Society. The journal was established in 1991 and covers the circuits-and-systems aspects of video technologies.

== History ==
The journal was established in 1991 as a specialised venue for research on video technology within the circuits and systems community. Originally focused on topics such as video compression, hardware, and systems, its scope was subsequently broadened to encompass video analysis and processing more generally. The current editor-in-chief is Shan Liu (Tencent), who assumed the role in 2025 after serving as the journal's associate editor-in-chief from 2024 to 2025.

== Scope ==
The journal covers all aspects of visual information relating to video or with the potential to affect future developments in video technology and video systems, including image and video processing; analysis and computer vision; compression; communication; storage; hardware and software systems; and applications. General, theoretical, and application-oriented papers with a circuits and systems perspective are encouraged on topics such as image/video acquisition, representation, presentation and display; processing, filtering and transforms; analysis and synthesis; learning and understanding; compression, transmission, communication and networking; storage, retrieval, indexing and search; and hardware and software design and implementation.

== Abstracting and indexing ==
The journal is abstracted and indexed in Web of Science (Science Citation Index Expanded), Scopus, and DBLP.

According to SCImago Journal Rank, the journal is ranked in the first quartile (Q1) in both Electrical and Electronic Engineering and Media Technology, with an h-index of 195. According to the Journal Citation Reports, the journal has a 2025 impact factor of 11.1.

As of 2019, Nanyang Technological University described the journal as the leading international periodical in the area of video and vision technology, and noted it was ranked second in the Multimedia category under Google Scholar Metrics.

== Best Paper Award ==
The IEEE Circuits and Systems Society presents an annual Best Paper Award to recognise outstanding research published in the journal. Papers published during the three calendar years preceding the award year are eligible for nomination, and the award is presented at the IEEE International Symposium on Circuits and Systems (ISCAS).
