= Audio compression =

Audio compression may refer to:

- Audio compression (data), a type of lossy or lossless compression in which the amount of data in a recorded waveform is reduced to differing extents for transmission respectively with or without some loss of quality, used in CD and MP3 encoding, Internet radio, and the like
- Dynamic range compression, also called audio level compression, in which the dynamic range, the difference between loud and quiet, of an audio waveform is reduced
