= Daala =

Video coding format

- Filename extension: .ogv
- Internet media type: video/ogg
- Developed by: Xiph.Org, Mozilla, IETF
- Type of format: Compressed Video
- Contained by: Ogg
- Extended to: AV1
- Open format?: Yes
- Website: xiph.org/daala

Daala is a video coding format that was under development by the Xiph.Org Foundation, under the lead of Timothy B. Terriberry and mainly sponsored by the Mozilla Corporation. Like Theora and Opus, Daala is available free of any royalties and its reference implementation is being developed as free and open-source software. The name is taken from the fictional character of Admiral Natasi Daala from the Star Wars universe.

The reference implementation is written in C and published, together with its source code, as free software under the terms of a BSD-like license. Software patents are being filed for techniques used in and developed for Daala. Those patents are freely licensed to everybody to use for any purpose. However, the patent holders reserve the right to use them to counter patent infringement lawsuits filed by others.

Since June 20, 2013, the development is accompanied by a series of sporadically published posts on the underlying technology on the website of the Xiph.Org Foundation. The Daala project is one of the collaborators in the IETF's NETVC project.

== Design goals ==
Daala is aimed to be a suitable proposal for a new video coding standard for the Internet and real-time applications. Therefore, it is meant to be usable free from patent licensing constraints and to be openly documented to enable widespread adoption. Also, it is being designed to cover a broad spectrum of use cases.

Daala was projected to eventually perform as well as if not better than other modern formats. The developers want to rely less on improving traditional design principles incrementally as such effort is observed to deliver decreasing returns after many years, and tends to grow complexity. (All widely adopted designs to date share the same basic design that dates back to H.261 from three decades ago.) Instead, the higher risk of researching and trying new basic techniques is expected to yield unprecedented and potentially more useful algorithms. Such an approach also makes software patent infringement less likely.

Moreover, possibilities for parallel processing are considered and hardware support is being pursued.

Daala is intended to be a high-efficiency video coding format for use cases similar to those of High Efficiency Video Coding (HEVC or H.265) and VP9. It has been stated that the performance goal is to be a generation beyond HEVC and VP9.

== Technology ==
As a basic technology Daala uses an unconventional discrete cosine transform with overlapping blocks. This reduces the blocking artifacts characteristic of other video codecs that use the discrete cosine transform (DCT) directly, without the need for additional filtering against blocking artifacts.

The coefficients are coded by Perceptual Vector Quantisation (PVQ, a spherical vector quantisation), which models human perception.

All substreams that the encoder produces are coded to one bitstream by a range encoder.

== History ==
Within the family of Xiph.Org multimedia formats, Daala is the successor to Theora from 2004. Problems with agreeing on video formats for WebRTC and successes in the development of the audio coding standard Opus are being cited as motivations for developing a video coding standard. Following up on the successful standardisation of Opus at the Internet Engineering Task Force (IETF), it was planned to also develop a worldwide video coding standard there. The purpose of Daala is to provide an initial proposal for the development of that standard. Therefore, it is hoped to be transformed by or reassembled with a lot of useful contributions by other parties.

First experimental code already existed in 2010. First steps in moving from merely investigating coding techniques to having a functional prototype were planned to start on May 27, 2013. On May 30 an alpha prototype of Daala was used to stream video over the Internet.

On September 17, 2014, it was generally stated that it could produce better results than its peers up to about 0.5 bits per pixel.

According to Timothy Terriberry, another year of development is needed as of January 2015.

After several preliminary meetings, a respective working group with the mission to develop an Internet Video Codec (NetVC) officially commenced activity on May 18, 2015. Among other contributions, a series of coding techniques from Daala were officially proposed to the group.

On September 1, 2015, Mozilla announced that the Alliance for Open Media would use elements of Daala to develop a royalty free video format, AOMedia Video 1.

== NETVC ==
On March 24, 2015, Daala was presented to the IETF as a candidate for their Internet Video Codec (NETVC) video standard. Daala coding techniques have been proposed to the IETF for inclusion into NETVC.

== See also ==
- WebM – a video file format for royalty-free use in the HTML5 video element
- AV1 – a next-generation video coding format in development by the Alliance for Open Media that uses elements from Daala and other modern video coding formats
- Comparison of video codecs
