= Ittiam Systems =

Indian technology company

- Type: Venture Capital Funded
- Industry: Digital Signal Processing Systems
- Founded: 1 January 2001
- Headquarters: Bangalore, India
- Key people: Chairman and CEO= Srini Rajam
- Revenue: US$20Million (2012) Royalty income was 35% of annual revenue during this period.
- Number of employees: 250+
- Website: www.ittiam.com

Ittiam Systems is an Indian technology company founded by ex-Managing Director of Texas Instruments' India Srini Rajam in 2001. It is headquartered in Bangalore, India and has marketing offices in the United States, UK, France, Japan, Mainland China, Singapore and Taiwan.

Ittiam Systems is India's first technology firm to be based on licensing of intellectual property (IP). Revenue is mainly generated through licensing of its DSP intellectual property and reference designs.

One of its early United States customers was e.Digital Corporation, a San Diego–based company that developed the digEplayer portable audio/video in-flight entertainment device under contract by Tacoma, Washington–based APS, now named digEcor.

Ittiam Systems demonstrated its HEVC and VP9 video coding implementations accelerated using ARM Mali-T600 GPU Compute technology at CES 2014 and MWC 2014.

Ittiam Systems supplies optimized software video and audio codecs that power the multimedia experience in the Android Open Source Project (AOSP).

Ittiam has licensed it's AI Powered Media Transcoder Solution to Japan based WOWOW. The Transcoder provides high performance, high quality video encoding along with high quality AAC based Audio encoder.
