= Digital video =

Digital electronic representation of moving visual images

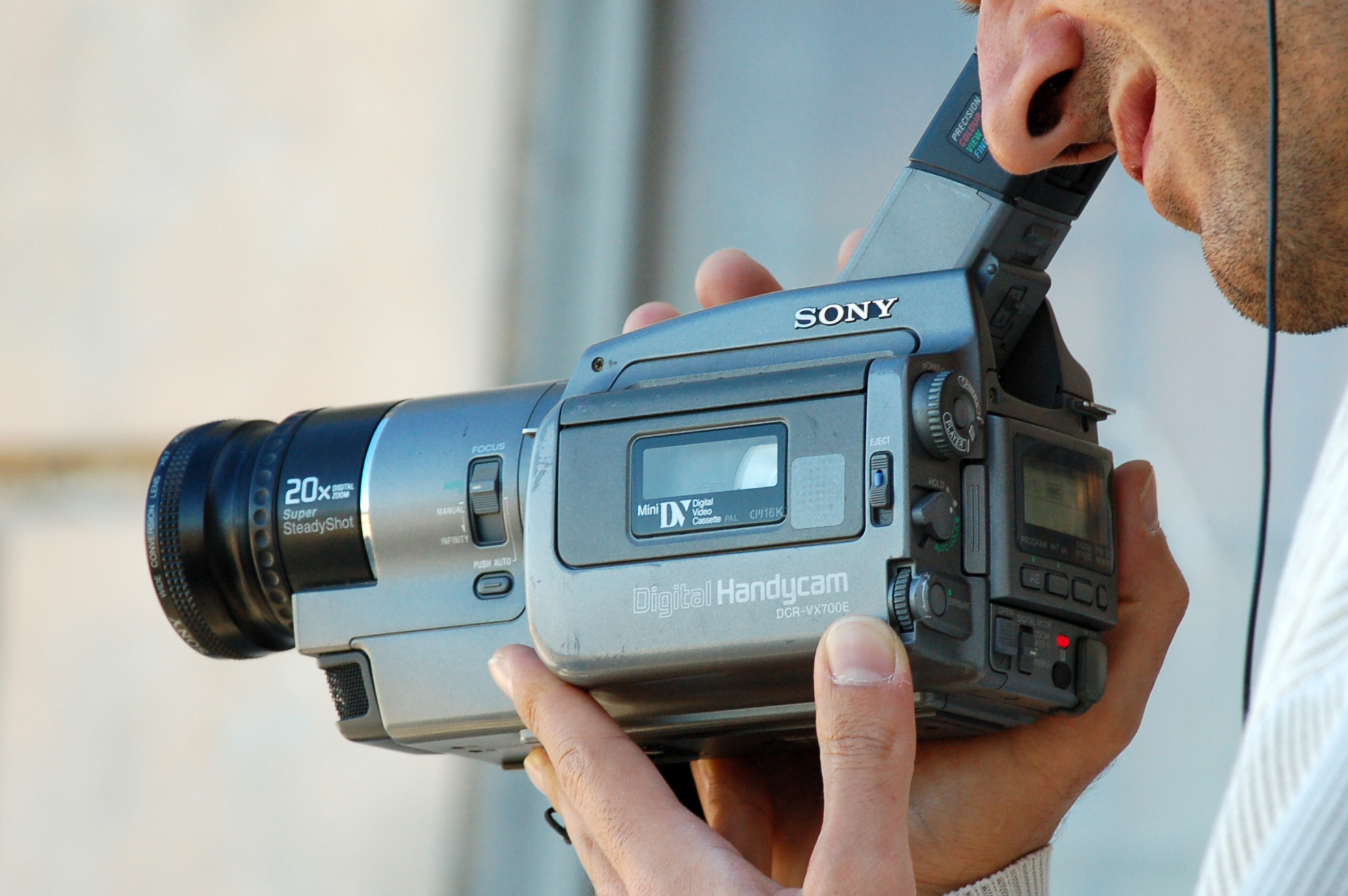
Sony digital video camera used for recording content

Digital video is an electronic representation of moving visual images (video) in the form of encoded digital data. This is in contrast to analog video, which represents moving visual images in the form of analog signals. Digital video comprises a series of digital images displayed in rapid succession, usually at 24, 25, 30, or 60 frames per second. Digital video has many advantages, such as easy copying, multicasting, sharing and storage.

Digital video was first introduced commercially in 1986 with the Sony D1 format, which recorded an uncompressed standard-definition component video signal in digital form. In addition to uncompressed formats, popular compressed digital video formats today include MPEG-2, H.264 and AV1. Modern interconnect standards used for playback of digital video include HDMI, DisplayPort, Digital Visual Interface (DVI) and serial digital interface (SDI).

Digital video can be copied and reproduced with no degradation in quality. In contrast, when analog sources are copied, they experience generation loss. Digital video can be stored on digital media such as Blu-ray, on computer data storage, or streamed over the Internet to end users who watch content on a personal computer or mobile device screen or a digital smart TV. Today, digital video content such as TV shows and movies also includes a digital audio soundtrack.

== History ==
=== Cameras ===
The basis for digital video cameras is metal–oxide–semiconductor (MOS) image sensors. The first practical semiconductor image sensor was the charge-coupled device (CCD), invented in 1969 by Willard S. Boyle, who won a Nobel Prize for his work in physics. Following the commercialization of CCD sensors during the late 1970s to early 1980s, the entertainment industry slowly began transitioning to digital imaging and digital video from analog video over the next two decades. The CCD was followed by the CMOS active-pixel sensor (CMOS sensor), developed in the 1990s.

Major films (Note: Defined as the top 200 grossing live-action films) shot on digital video overtook those shot on film in 2013. Since 2016, over 90% of major films have been shot on digital video. As of 2017, 92% of films are shot on digital. Only 24 major films released in 2018 were shot on 35mm. Today, cameras from companies like Sony, Panasonic, JVC and Canon offer a variety of choices for shooting high-definition video. At the high end of the market, there has been an emergence of cameras aimed specifically at the digital cinema market. These cameras from Sony, Vision Research, Arri, Blackmagic Design, Panavision, Grass Valley and Red offer resolution and dynamic range that exceeds that of traditional video cameras, which are designed for the limited needs of broadcast television.

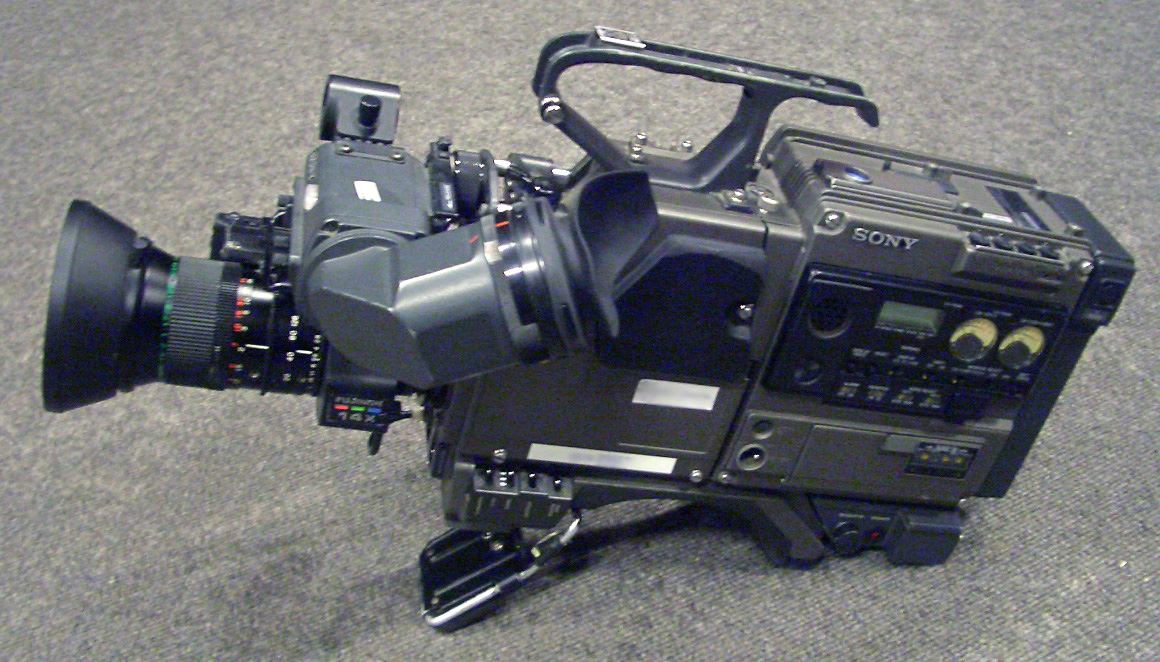
A Betacam SP camera, originally developed in 1986 by Sony

=== Coding ===
In the 1970s, pulse-code modulation (PCM) induced the birth of digital video coding, demanding high bit rates of 45-140 Mbit/s for standard-definition (SD) content. By the 1980s, the discrete cosine transform (DCT) became the standard for digital video compression.

The first digital video coding standard was H.120, created by the (International Telegraph and Telephone Consultative Committee) or CCITT (now ITU-T) in 1984. H.120 was not practical due to weak performance. H.120 was based on differential pulse-code modulation (DPCM), a compression algorithm that was inefficient for video coding. During the late 1980s, a number of companies began experimenting with DCT, a much more efficient form of compression for video coding. The CCITT received 14 proposals for DCT-based video compression formats, in contrast to a single proposal based on vector quantization (VQ) compression. The H.261 standard was developed based on DCT compression, becoming first practical video coding standard. Since H.261, DCT compression has been adopted by all the major video coding standards that followed.

MPEG-1, developed by the Motion Picture Experts Group (MPEG), followed in 1991, and it was designed to compress VHS-quality video. It was succeeded in 1994 by MPEG-2/H.262, which became the standard video format for DVD and SD digital television. It was followed by MPEG-4 in 1999, and then in 2003 it was followed by H.264/MPEG-4 AVC, which has become the most widely used video coding standard.

The current-generation video coding format is HEVC (H.265), introduced in 2013. While AVC uses the integer DCT with 4x4 and 8x8 block sizes, HEVC uses integer DCT and DST transforms with varied block sizes between 4x4 and 32x32. HEVC is heavily patented, with the majority of patents belonging to Samsung Electronics, GE, NTT and JVC Kenwood. It is currently being challenged by the aiming-to-be-freely-licensed AV1 format. As of 2019, AVC is by far the most commonly used format for the recording, compression and distribution of video content, used by 91% of video developers, followed by HEVC, which is used by 43% of developers.

=== Production ===
Starting in the late 1970s to the early 1980s, video production equipment that was digital in its internal workings was introduced. These included time base correctors (TBC) (Note: For example, the Thomson-CSF 9100 Digital Video Processor, an internally all-digital full-frame TBC introduced in 1980.) and digital video effects (DVE) units. (Note: For example the Ampex ADO, and the NEC E-Flex.) They operated by taking a standard analog composite video input and digitizing it internally. This made it easier to either correct or enhance the video signal, as in the case of a TBC, or to manipulate and add effects to the video, in the case of a DVE unit. The digitized and processed video information was then converted back to standard analog video for output.

Later on in the 1970s, manufacturers of professional video broadcast equipment, such as Bosch (through their Fernseh division) and Ampex developed prototype digital videotape recorders (VTR) in their research and development labs. Bosch's machine used a modified 1-inch type B videotape transport and recorded an early form of CCIR 601 digital video. Ampex's prototype digital video recorder used a modified 2-inch quadruplex videotape VTR (an Ampex AVR-3) fitted with custom digital video electronics and a special octaplex 8-head headwheel (regular analog 2" quad machines only used 4 heads). Like standard 2" quad, the audio on the Ampex prototype digital machine, nicknamed Annie by its developers, still recorded the audio in analog as linear tracks on the tape. None of these machines from these manufacturers were ever marketed commercially.

Digital video was first introduced commercially in 1986 with the Sony D1 format, which recorded an uncompressed standard definition component video signal in digital form. Component video connections required 3 cables, but most television facilities were wired for composite NTSC or PAL video using one cable. Due to this incompatibility, the cost of the recorder, D1 was used primarily by large television networks and other component-video capable video studios.

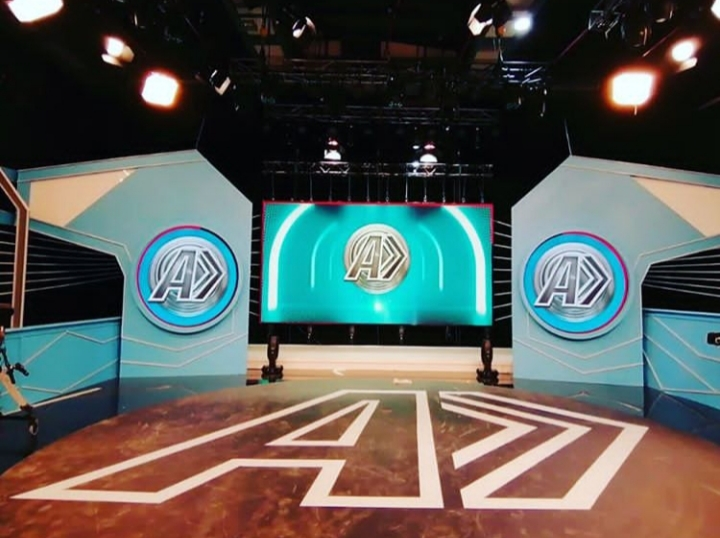
A professional television studio set in Chile

In 1988, Sony and Ampex co-developed and released the D2 digital videocassette format, which recorded video digitally without compression in ITU-601 format, much like D1. In comparison, D2 had the major difference of encoding the video in composite form to the NTSC standard, thereby only requiring single-cable composite video connections to and from a D2 VCR. This made it a perfect fit for the majority of television facilities at the time. D2 was a successful format in the television broadcast industry throughout the late '80s and the '90s. D2 was also widely used in that era as the master tape format for mastering LaserDiscs. (Note: Prior to D2, most LaserDiscs were mastered using analog 1" Type C videotape)

D1 & D2 would eventually be replaced by cheaper systems using video compression, most notably Sony's Digital Betacam, that were introduced into the network's television studios. Other examples of digital video formats utilizing compression were Ampex's DCT (the first to employ such when introduced in 1992), the industry-standard DV and MiniDV and its professional variations, Sony's DVCAM and Panasonic's DVCPRO, and Betacam SX, a lower-cost variant of Digital Betacam using MPEG-2 compression.

The Sony logo, creator of the Betacam

One of the first digital video products to run on personal computers was PACo: The PICS Animation Compiler from The Company of Science & Art in Providence, RI. It was developed starting in 1990 and first shipped in May 1991. PACo could stream unlimited-length video with synchronized sound from a single file (with the .CAV file extension) on CD-ROM. Creation required a Mac, and playback was possible on Macs, PCs, and Sun SPARCstations.

QuickTime, Apple Computer's multimedia framework, was released in June 1991. Audio Video Interleave from Microsoft followed in 1992. Initial consumer-level content creation tools were crude, requiring an analog video source to be digitized to a computer-readable format. While low-quality at first, consumer digital video increased rapidly in quality, first with the introduction of playback standards such as MPEG-1 and MPEG-2 (adopted for use in television transmission and DVD media), and the introduction of the DV tape format, allowing recordings in the format to be transferred directly to digital video files using a FireWire port on an editing computer. This simplified the process, allowing non-linear editing systems (NLE) to be deployed cheaply and widely on desktop computers with no external playback or recording equipment needed.

The widespread adoption of digital video and accompanying compression formats has reduced the bandwidth needed for a high-definition video signal (with HDV and AVCHD, as well as several professional formats such as XDCAM, all using less bandwidth than a standard definition analog signal). These savings have increased the number of channels available on cable television and direct broadcast satellite systems, created opportunities for spectrum reallocation of terrestrial television broadcast frequencies, and made tapeless camcorders based on flash memory possible, among other innovations and efficiencies.

=== Culture ===
Culturally, digital video has allowed video and film to become widely available and popular, beneficial to entertainment, education, and research. Digital video is increasingly common in schools, with students and teachers taking an interest in learning how to use it in relevant ways. Digital video also has healthcare applications, allowing doctors to track infant heart rates and oxygen levels.

In addition, the switch from analog to digital video impacted media in various ways, such as in how businesses use cameras for surveillance. Closed circuit television (CCTV) switched to using digital video recorders (DVR), presenting the issue of how to store recordings for evidence collection. Today, digital video is able to be compressed in order to save storage space.

=== Digital television ===
Digital television (DTV) is the production and transmission of digital video from networks to consumers. This technique uses digital encoding instead of analog signals used prior to the 1950s. As compared to analog methods, DTV is faster and provides more capabilities and options for data to be transmitted and shared.

Digital television's roots are tied to the availability of inexpensive, high-performance computers. It was not until the 1990s that digital TV became a real possibility. Digital television was previously not practically feasible due to the impractically high bandwidth requirements of uncompressed video, requiring around 200 Mbit/s for a standard-definition television (SDTV) signal, and over 1 Gbit/s for high-definition television (HDTV).

== Overview ==
Digital video comprises a series of digital images displayed in rapid succession. In the context of video, these images are called frames. (Note: In fact, the still images correspond to frames only in the case of progressive scan video. In interlaced video, they correspond to fields. See § Interlacing for clarification.) The rate at which frames are displayed is known as the frame rate and is measured in frames per second. Every frame is a digital image and so comprises a formation of pixels. The color of a pixel is represented by a fixed number of bits of that color, where the information of the color is stored within the image. For example, 8-bit captures 256 levels per channel, and 10-bit captures 1,024 levels per channel. The more bits, the more subtle variations of colors can be reproduced. This is called the color depth, or bit depth, of the video.

=== Interlacing ===
In interlaced video, each frame is composed of two halves of an image. The first half contains only the odd-numbered lines of a full frame. The second half contains only the even-numbered lines. These halves are referred to individually as fields. Two consecutive fields compose a full frame. If an interlaced video has a frame rate of 30 frames per second, the field rate is 60 fields per second.

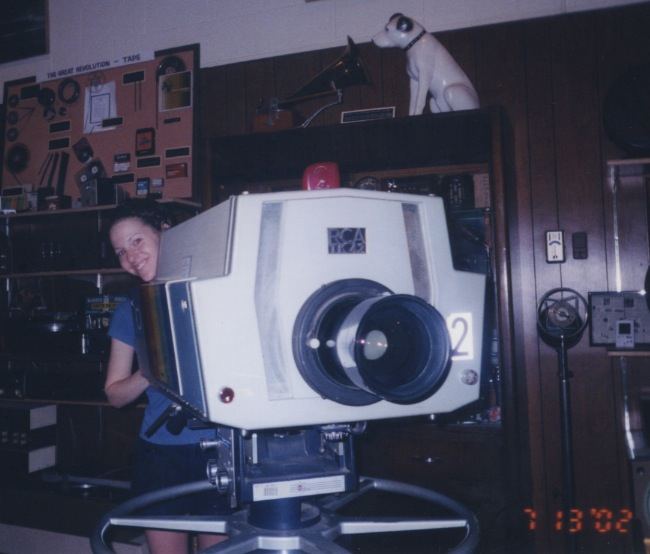
A broadcast television camera at the Pavek Museum in Minnesota

=== Bit rate and BPP ===
By definition, bit rate is a measurement of the rate of information content from the digital video stream. In the case of uncompressed video, bit rate corresponds directly to the quality of the video because bit rate is proportional to every property that affects the video quality. Bit rate is an important property when transmitting video because the transmission link must be capable of supporting that bit rate. Bit rate is also important when dealing with the storage of video because, as shown above, the video size is proportional to the bit rate and the duration. Video compression is used to greatly reduce the bit rate while having little effect on quality.

Bits per pixel (BPP) is a measure of the efficiency of compression. A true-color video with no compression at all may have a BPP of 24 bits/pixel. Chroma subsampling can reduce the BPP to 16 or 12 bits/pixel. Applying JPEG compression on every frame can reduce the BPP to 8 or even 1 bits/pixel. Applying video compression algorithms like MPEG1, MPEG2 or MPEG4 allows for fractional BPP values to exist.

==== Constant bit rate versus variable bit rate ====
BPP represents the average bits per pixel. There are compression algorithms that keep the BPP almost constant throughout the entire duration of the video. In this case, we also get video output with a constant bitrate (CBR). This CBR video is suitable for real-time, non-buffered, fixed bandwidth video streaming (e.g., in videoconferencing). Since not all frames can be compressed at the same level, because quality is more severely impacted for scenes of high complexity, some algorithms try to constantly adjust the BPP. They keep the BPP high while compressing complex scenes and low for less demanding scenes. This way, it provides the best quality at the smallest average bit rate (and the smallest file size, accordingly). This method produces a variable bitrate because it tracks the variations of the BPP.

== Technical overview ==
Standard film stocks typically record at 24 frames per second. For video, there are two frame rate standards: NTSC, at 30/1.001 (about 29.97) frames per second (about 59.94 fields per second), and PAL, 25 frames per second (50 fields per second). Digital video cameras come in two different image capture formats: interlaced and progressive scan. Interlaced cameras record the image in alternating sets of lines: the odd-numbered lines are scanned, and then the even-numbered lines are scanned, then the odd-numbered lines are scanned again, and so on.

One set of odd or even lines is referred to as a field, and a consecutive pairing of two fields of opposite parity is called a frame. Progressive scan cameras record all lines in each frame as a single unit. Thus, interlaced video captures the scene motion twice as often as progressive video does for the same frame rate. Progressive scan generally produces a slightly sharper image; however, motion may not be as smooth as interlaced video.

Digital video can be copied with no generation loss, which degrades quality in analog systems. However, a change in parameters like frame size or a change of the digital format can decrease the quality of the video due to image scaling and transcoding losses. Digital video can be manipulated and edited on non-linear editing systems.

Digital video has a significantly lower cost than 35 mm film. In comparison to the high cost of film stock, the digital media used for digital video recording, such as flash memory or hard disk drive is very inexpensive. Digital video also allows footage to be viewed on location without the expensive and time-consuming chemical processing required by film. Network transfer of digital video makes physical deliveries of tapes and film reels unnecessary.

A short video sequence in native 16K

A diagram of 35 mm film as used in Cinemascope cameras

Digital television (including higher quality HDTV) was introduced in most developed countries in the early 2000s. Today, digital video is used in modern mobile phones and video conferencing systems. Digital video is used for Internet distribution of media, including streaming video and peer-to-peer movie distribution.

Many types of video compression exist for serving digital video over the internet and on optical disks. The file sizes of digital video used for professional editing are generally not practical for these purposes, and the video requires further compression with codecs to be used for recreational purposes.

As of 2017, the highest image resolution demonstrated for digital video generation is 132.7 megapixels (15360 x 8640 pixels). The highest speed is attained in industrial and scientific high-speed cameras that are capable of filming 1024x1024 video at up to 1 million frames per second for brief periods of recording.

== Technical properties ==
Live digital video consumes bandwidth. Recorded digital video consumes data storage. The amount of bandwidth or storage required is determined by the frame size, color depth and frame rate. Each pixel consumes a number of bits determined by the color depth. The data required to represent a frame of data is determined by multiplying by the number of pixels in the image. The bandwidth is determined by multiplying the storage requirement for a frame by the frame rate. The overall storage requirements for a program can then be determined by multiplying bandwidth by the duration of the program.

These calculations are accurate for uncompressed video, but due to the relatively high bit rate of uncompressed video, video compression is extensively used. In the case of compressed video, each frame requires only a small percentage of the original bits. This reduces the data or bandwidth consumption by a factor of 5 to 12 times when using lossless compression, but more commonly, lossy compression is used due to its reduction of data consumption by factors of 20 to 200. Note that it is not necessary that all frames are equally compressed by the same percentage. Instead, consider the average factor of compression for all the frames taken together.

== Interfaces and cables ==
Purpose-built digital video interfaces

- Digital component video
- Digital Visual Interface (DVI)
- DisplayPort
- HDBaseT
- High-Definition Multimedia Interface (HDMI)
- Unified Display Interface

General-purpose interfaces used to carry digital video

- FireWire (IEEE 1394)
- Universal Serial Bus (USB)

The following interface has been designed for carrying MPEG-Transport compressed video:

- DVB-ASI

Compressed video is also carried using UDP-IP over Ethernet. Two approaches exist for this:

- Using RTP as a wrapper for video packets as with SMPTE 2022
- 1–7 MPEG Transport Packets are placed directly in the UDP packet

Other methods of carrying video over IP

- Network Device Interface
- SMPTE 2110

== Storage formats ==
=== Encoding ===
- CCIR 601 used for broadcast stations
- VC-2 also known as Dirac Pro
- MPEG-4 good for online distribution of large videos and video recorded to flash memory
- MPEG-2 used for DVDs, Super-VCDs, and many broadcast television formats
- MPEG-1 used for video CDs
- H.261
- H.263
- H.264 also known as MPEG-4 Part 10, or as AVC, used for Blu-ray Discs and some broadcast television formats
- H.265 also known as MPEG-H Part 2, or as HEVC
- MOV used for QuickTime framework
- Theora used for video on Wikipedia

=== Tapes ===
- Betacam SX, MPEG IMX, Digital Betacam, or DigiBeta — professional video formats by Sony, based on original Betamax technology
- D-VHS — MPEG-2 format data recorded on a tape similar to S-VHS
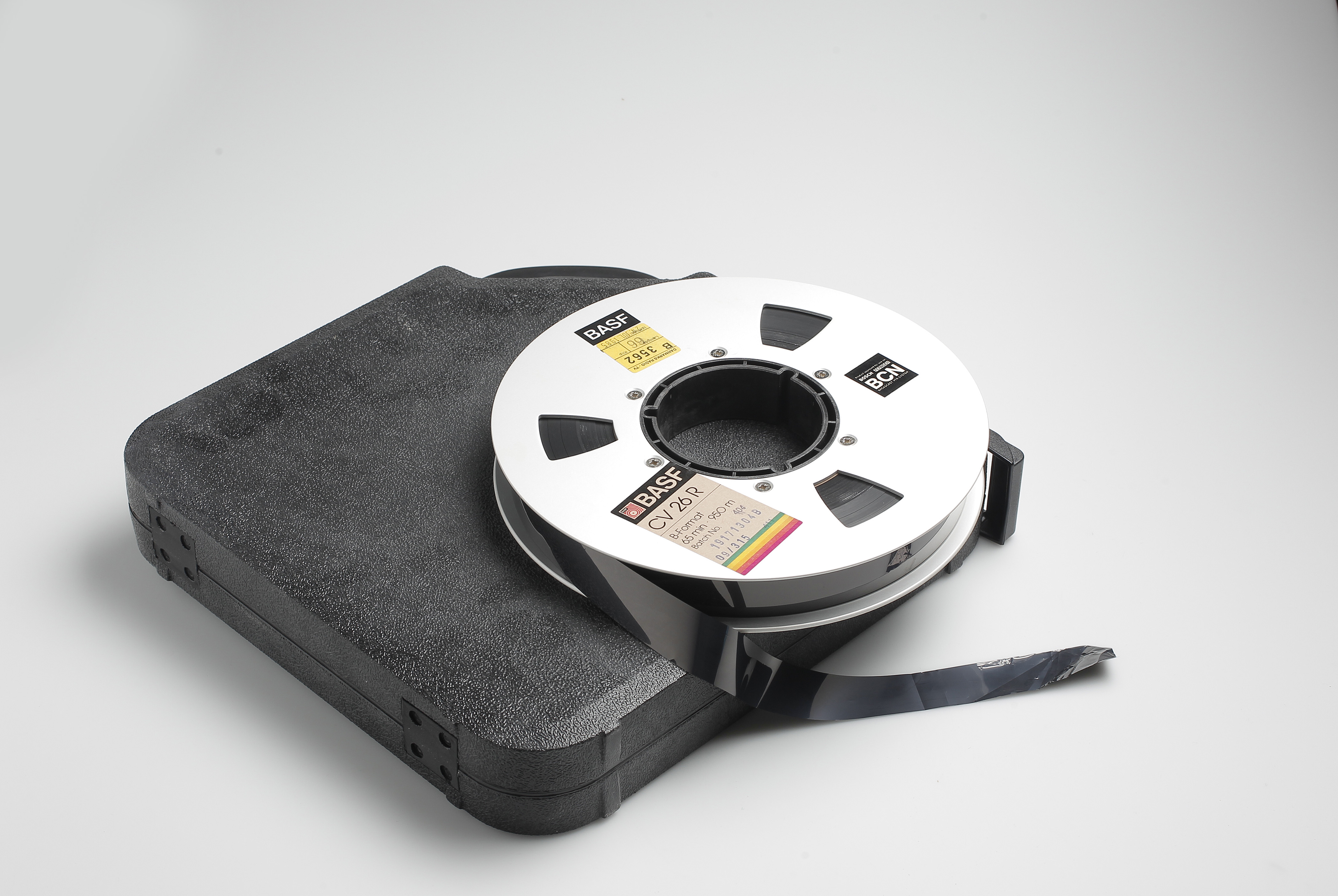
  An archived B-format video tape used in Danish broadcasting
- D1, D2, D3, D5, D7, D9 (also known as Digital-S) — various SMPTE professional digital video standards
- D8 — DV-format data recorded on Hi8-compatible cassettes; largely a consumer format
- DCT — first digital videotape format to use data compression
- DV, MiniDV — used in most of digital videocassette consumer camcorders; designed for high quality and easy editing; can also record high-definition data (HDV) in MPEG-2 format
- DVCAM, DVCPRO — used in professional broadcast operations; similar to DV but generally considered more robust; though DV-compatible, these formats have better audio handling.
- DVCPRO50 and DVCPRO HD support higher bandwidths as compared to Panasonic's DVCPRO.
- HDCAM and HDCAM SR were introduced by Sony as a high-definition alternative to DigiBeta.
- MicroMV — MPEG-2-format data recorded on a very small, matchbook-sized cassette; obsolete
- ProHD — name used by JVC for its MPEG-2-based professional camcorders

=== Discs ===
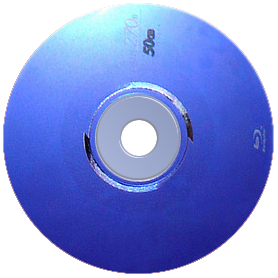
The Blu-ray disc, a type of optical disc used for media storage

- Blu-ray
- DVD
- VCD

== See also ==
- Digital audio
- Digital cinematography
- Display aspect ratio
- Display resolution
- Index of video-related articles
- Internet video
- Online video platform
- Video coding format
- Video editing software
- Webcam
