= Gary Sullivan (engineer) =

American electrical engineer (b.1960)

Gary Joseph Sullivan (born 1960) is an American electrical engineer who led the development of the AVC, HEVC, and VVC video coding standards and created the DirectX Video Acceleration (DXVA) API/DDI video decoding feature of the Microsoft Windows operating system. He is currently Director of Video Research and Standards at Dolby Laboratories and is the chair of ISO/IEC JTC 1/SC 29 (Coding of audio, picture, multimedia and hypermedia information – the committee that oversees JPEG and MPEG standardization) and of the ITU-T Video Coding Experts Group (VCEG).

He was the chairman and a co-founder of the Joint Video Team (JVT) standardization committee that developed the H.264/AVC standard, and he personally edited large portions of it. In January 2010, he became a founding co-chairman of the Joint Collaborative Team on Video Coding (JCT-VC) and an editor for developing the High Efficiency Video Coding (HEVC) standard. In October 2015, he became a founding co-chairman of the Joint Video Experts Team (JVET) that developed the Versatile Video Coding (VVC) standard. He has also led and contributed to a number of other video and image related standardization projects such as extensions of ITU-T H.263 video coding, multiview and 3D video coding for AVC and HEVC, and JPEG XR image coding. He has also published research work on various topics relating to video and image compression.

== Biography ==
Sullivan was born and raised in Louisville, Kentucky, and attended the Ascension and St. Margaret Mary elementary schools and Trinity High School, graduating in 1978. He received B.S. and M.Eng. degrees in electrical engineering from the University of Louisville J. B. Speed School of Engineering, Kentucky, in 1982 and 1983, respectively. He received Ph.D. and Engineer degrees in electrical engineering from the University of California, Los Angeles, in 1991.

Sullivan joined Dolby Labs as Director of Video Research and Standards in 2023.

From 1999 to 2022, Sullivan was a Video and Image Technology Architect at Microsoft Corporation. At Microsoft he also designed and remains lead engineer for the DirectX Video Acceleration (DXVA) API/DDI video decoding feature of the Microsoft Windows operating system platform. His DXVA designs include decoding acceleration schemes for H.261, MPEG-1 Part 2, H.262/MPEG-2 Part 2, H.263, MPEG-4 Part 2, H.264/MPEG-4 Part 10: AVC, Windows Media Video versions 8 and 9, VC-1, Scalable Video Coding, Multiview Video Coding, and HEVC.

Prior to joining Microsoft, he was the manager of communications core research at PictureTel Corporation, the former world leader in videoconferencing communication. He was previously a Howard Hughes Fellow and member of technical staff in the Advanced Systems Division of Hughes Aircraft Company, and a terrain-following radar system software engineer for Texas Instruments.

== Awards ==
Recognitions and awards for Sullivan and the projects he has led in the standardization community have included the following:

- IEEE Arun N. Netravali Video Analytics, Technology, and Systems Award, "for leadership in and contributions to developing the High Efficiency Video Coding (HEVC) international standard" (together with Benjamin Bross and Jens-Rainer Ohm), 2027
- Fellow of the Association for Computing Machinery (ACM), "for contributions to video and image compression and leadership in its standardization", 2022
- Fellow of the Society of Motion Picture and Television Engineers (SMPTE) for "individuals who have, by proficiency and contributions, attained an outstanding rank among engineers or executives, in the motion-picture, television or related industries", 2022
- Digital Processing Medal of SMPTE for innovation and industry leadership in image and video compression, 2019
- Primetime Emmy Engineering Award – awarded to the JCT-VC standards committee by the Academy of Television Arts and Sciences for development of the High Efficiency Video Coding (HEVC) standard, 2017
- Best Paper Award of IEEE Transactions on Circuits and Systems for Video Technology, 2017 (together with Thiow Keng Tan, Rajitha Weerakkody, Marta Mrak, Naeem Ramzan, Vittorio Baroncini, and Jens-Rainer Ohm)
- Best Paper Award of IEEE Transactions on Circuits and Systems for Video Technology, 2013 (together with Jens-Rainer Ohm, Woo-Jin Han, and Thomas Wiegand)
- IEEE Masaru Ibuka Consumer Electronics Award (together with Gisle Bjøntegaard and Thomas Wiegand), 2012
- Fellow of the Society of Photo-Optical Instrumentation Engineers (SPIE) for achievements in video and image compression technologies, 2009
- J. B. Speed Professional Award in Engineering, 2009
- Paired Technology & Engineering Emmy Awards – one awarded to VCEG and one to MPEG by the National Academy of Television Arts and Sciences for development of the H.264/MPEG-4 AVC standard, 2009
- Primetime Emmy Engineering Award – awarded to the JVT standards committee by the Academy of Television Arts and Sciences for development of the High Profile of H.264/MPEG-4 AVC, 2008
- International Multimedia Telecommunications Consortium (IMTC) Leadership award, 2008
- Institute of Electrical and Electronics Engineers (IEEE) Consumer Electronics Engineering Excellence Award, 2008
- Fellow of the IEEE for contributions to video coding and its standardization, 2006
- The video coding work of the ITU-T led by Sullivan for the preceding ten years was voted as the most influential area of the standardization work of the CCITT and ITU-T in their 50-year history, 2006
- Technical Achievement award of the International Committee for Information Technology Standards (INCITS) for his work on H.264/MPEG-4 AVC and other video standardization topics, 2005

== Leadership ==
Sullivan has held the following chairmanships in video coding standardization organizations:

- Rapporteur/chairman of the ITU-T Video Coding Experts Group (VCEG) of ITU-T Study Group 16 – since 1996
- Chairman and co-chairman of the video part of the ISO/IEC Moving Picture Experts Group (MPEG) – chairman March 2001 to May 2002, co-chairman January 2005 to January 2018
- Chairman and co-chairman of the Joint Video Team – chairman for the development of the next generation H.264/MPEG-4 AVC video coding standard and its fidelity-range extensions (FRExt), and co-chairman for the development of the Scalable Video Coding (SVC) and Multiview Video Coding (MVC) extensions – founded December 2001 (group closed November 2009)
- Co-chairman of Joint Collaborative Team on Video Coding (JCT-VC) for developing the High Efficiency Video Coding (HEVC) standard – founded January 2010 (group closed July 2020)
- Co-chairman of Joint Collaborative Team on 3D Video Coding (JCT-3V) for developing 3D extensions of video coding standards – founded July 2012 (group closed June 2016)
- Co-chairman of the Joint Video Experts Team (JVET) for the development of the Versatile Video Coding standard – founded October 2015, served until July 2021
- Chair of ISO/IEC JTC 1/SC 29 – selected as chair-elect in June 2020, chair since January 2021
- Liaison representative to MPEG and JPEG from ITU-T on video and image coding topics

The JVT, JCT-VC, JCT-3V, and JVET have been joint projects between the VCEG and MPEG organizations.

== See also ==
- Moving Picture Experts Group (MPEG)
- Video Coding Experts Group (VCEG)
- Joint Photographic Experts Group (JPEG)
- JPEG XR
- High Efficiency Video Coding (HEVC)
- H.264/MPEG-4 AVC
- H.263 and MPEG-4 Part 2
- H.262/MPEG-2 Part 2
- H.261 and MPEG-1 Part 2
- DirectX Video Acceleration
- Versatile Video Coding
- Windows Media Video
- VC-1
