= H.120 =

ITU-T recommendation

- Status: Published
- Year started: 1984
- Latest version: (03/93)
- Organization: ITU-T
- Committee: VCEG (then: Specialists Group on Coding for Visual Telephony)
- Related standards: H.261, H.262, H.263, H.264, H.265
- Domain: video compression
- Website: https://www.itu.int/rec/T-REC-H.120

H.120 was the first digital video compression standard. It was developed by the COST 211 European research project and published by the CCITT (now the ITU-T) in 1984, with a revision in 1988 that included contributions proposed by other organizations. The video turned out not to be of adequate quality, there were few implementations, and there are no existing codecs for the format, but it provided important knowledge leading directly to its practical successors, such as H.261. The latest revision was published in March 1993.

== Stream format ==
H.120 streams ran at 1544 kbit/s for NTSC and 2048 kbit/s for PAL. Version 1 (1984) featured conditional replenishment, differential pulse-code modulation (DPCM), scalar quantization, variable-length coding and a switch for sampling. Version 2 (1988) added motion compensation and background prediction. A final edition (without new technical content) was published in 1993 as a result of the creation of the ITU-T to replace the prior CCITT standardization body.

== Problems and knowledge gained ==
H.120 video was not of good enough quality for practical use. Digital signal processing operations were minimized to enable real-time operation. Since differential PCM works on a pixel-by-pixel basis, reducing the bitrate sufficiently required lowering the spatial and temporal resolution, and the quantization of pixel differences was coarse. Frame memory storage was expensive at the time, further motivating a lowered spatial resolution.

Each field of standard-definition video was subsampled vertically to 143 lines and horizontally to at most 256 samples per line (a 2:1 reduction vertically and about a 2.8:1 reduction horizontally). In moving areas, the number of samples per line was reduced by another factor of 2 using a quincunx sampling pattern. Difference values were coarsely represented using a quantization table with only 16 values of pixel differences. Fields were sometimes skipped to reduce temporal resolution as well.

It became clear to researchers that to improve the video quality without exceeding the target bitrate for the stream, it would be necessary to encode using an average of less than one bit for each pixel. This would require groups of pixels to be coded together. This led to the use of the discrete cosine transform in codecs that followed H.120, such as H.261, the first practical video encoding standard.
