= LG GD910 =

2009 South Korean watch phone

LG-GD910
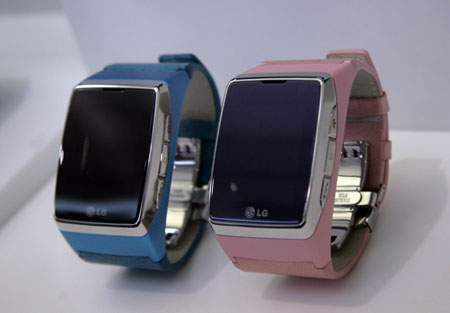
- Manufacturer: LG Electronics
- Type: watch phone
- Availability by region: Q4 2009
- Compatible networks: GSM 850/900/1800/1900 MHz, GPRS Class 10, EDGE, HSDPA 2100 MHz @ 7.2 Mbit/s
- Dimensions: 60×39×13.9 mm (2.36×1.54×0.55 in)
- Weight: 90.75 g (3 oz)
- Operating system: LG's Flash-Based OS
- Storage: 2 GB
- Rear camera: 0.3-megapixel
- Display: 1.43" CIF
- Connectivity: Bluetooth 2.0
- Data inputs: Touchscreen + Side buttons

The LG-GD910 is a 3G watch phone that has a touchscreen and video calling capabilities; manufacturer LG Electronics claims it is the first market-ready example of such a device.

== Features ==
The LG-GD910 is constructed using a waterproof, metal casing and has a curved, tempered glass face. It is 13.9 mm thick. The touchscreen is 1.43-inches (3.63 cm) across, 352 x 288 pixels, and uses LG’s Flash interface.

The LG-GD910 is compatible with 7.2 Mbit/s 3G HSDPA, which enables the high speed data transmission required to make video calls using the in-built camera. It also supports Bluetooth headsets, including stereo audio, and has a built-in speaker. There is a Text to Speech option for handling text messages and other information, and voice recognition features can be used to look up contact details and make calls. The device is preloaded with over 15 languages, not including English.

== Availability ==
The LG-GD910 was developed from a prototype that the company first demonstrated in 2008. The LG-GD910 was first publicly shown at CES 2009. As it was a limited edition product, only a limited number were released in Europe and a few other countries. Despite its HSDPA capabilities, it lacks a built-in web browser. It also includes Multimedia Messaging Service (MMS) capabilities, but this did not work in Korea. Orange confirmed that only SMS is fully working with stock firmware.

The LG-GD910 was launched in Europe during 2009 via the Orange network. and in India in April 2010.
