= Source Input Format =

File format

Source Input Format (SIF) defined in MPEG-1, is a video format that was developed to allow the storage and transmission of digital video.

- 625/50 SIF format (PAL/SECAM) has a resolution of 352 × 288 active pixels (half of PAL 704 × 576) [or 360 × 288 active pixels (half of PAL 720 × 576)] and a refresh rate of 25 frames per second.
- 525/59.94 SIF Format (NTSC) has a resolution of 352 × 240 active pixels (half of NTSC 704 × 480) [or 360 × 240 active pixels (half of NTSC 720 × 480)] and a refresh rate of 29.97 frames per second.

When compared to the CCIR 601 specifications, which defines the appropriate parameters for digital encoding of TV signals, SIF can be seen as being reduced by half in all of height, width, frame-rate, and chrominance. SIF video is known as a constrained parameters bitstream.

On square-pixel displays (e.g., computer screens and many modern televisions) SIF images should be rescaled so that the picture covers a 4:3 area, in order to avoid a "stretched" look. So the computer industry has defined "square-pixel SIF" to be 320 x 240 active pixels (QVGA) or 384 x 288 active pixels, with a refresh rate of whatever the computer is capable of supporting. To reach that the SIF content need to be "expanded" horizontally by 12:11 for PAL (PAR = DAR : SAR = 4/3 : 352/288 = 12/11) and "reduced" horizontally by 10:11 for NTSC (PAR = DAR : SAR = 4/3 : 352/240 = 10/11).

== See also ==
- Common Intermediate Format (CIF)
