= Video Coding Experts Group =

Working group of ITU-T

- Abbreviation: VCEG
- Predecessor: Specialists Group on Coding for Visual Telephony
- Formation: 1984
- Type: Standards organization
- Purpose: Coding of video, images, audio, biomedical waveforms, and other signals
- Region served: Worldwide
- Rapporteur: Gary Sullivan
- Associate Rapporteur: Thomas Wiegand
- Associate Rapporteur: Yan Ye
- Parent organization: ITU-T Study Group 21
- Website: www.itu.int/en/ITU-T/studygroups/2022-2024/16/video/Pages/vceg.aspx

The Video Coding Experts Group or Visual Coding Experts Group (VCEG, also known as Question 6) is a working group of the ITU Telecommunication Standardization Sector (ITU-T) concerned with standards for compression coding of video, images, audio signals, biomedical waveforms, and other signals, and multimedia authentication technology. It is responsible for standardization of the "H.26x" line of video coding standards, the "T.8xx" line of image coding standards, and related technologies.

Administratively, VCEG is the informal name of Question 6 (Visual, audio and signal coding) of Working Party 3 (Media authenticity, processing and AI-enabled applications) of ITU-T Study Group 21 (Technologies for multimedia, content delivery and cable television). Its abbreviated title is ITU-T Q.6/SG21, or more simply, ITU-T Q6/21. SG21 was formed by a merger of the former Study Groups 9 and 16, effective in 2025, with VCEG retaining the same Question number 6 in the merged Study Group.

The goal of VCEG is to produce ITU-T Recommendations (international standards) for video coding and image coding methods appropriate for conversational (e.g. videoconferencing and video telephony) and non-conversational (e.g., streaming, broadcast, file download, media storage/playback, or digital cinema) audio/visual services. This mandate concerns the maintenance and extension of existing video coding Recommendations, and laying the ground for new Recommendations using advanced techniques to significantly improve the trade-offs between bit rate, quality, delay, and algorithm complexity. Video coding standards are desired with sufficient flexibility to accommodate a diverse number of transport types (Internet, LAN, Mobile, ISDN, GSTN, H.222.0, NGN, etc.).

In 2023, VCEG began working toward standardization of coding technology for biomedical signals and other waveform signals. Its first compression encoding standard in this area is planned to become Recommendation ITU-T T.261, with approval expected in 2026.

Question 6 is part of Study Group 21, which is responsible for standards relating to multimedia technologies, systems, applications, and services for current and future networks, including IP-based and cable-based networks. This encompasses multimedia terminals, systems (e.g., network signal processing equipment, multipoint conference units, gateways, gatekeepers, modems, and facsimile), protocols and signal processing (media coding).

== History ==
VCEG was preceded in the ITU-T (which was called the CCITT at the time) by the "Specialists Group on Coding for Visual Telephony" chaired by Sakae Okubo (NTT) which developed H.261. The first meeting of this group was held December 11–14, 1984, in Tokyo, Japan. Okubo was also the ITU-T coordinator for developing the H.262/MPEG-2 Part 2 video coding standard and the requirements chairman in MPEG for the MPEG-2 set of standards.

The first digital video coding standard was H.120, created by the CCITT (now ITU-T) in 1984. H.120 was not usable in practice, as its performance was too poor. H.120 was based on differential pulse-code modulation (DPCM), which had relatively inefficient compression. During the late 1980s, a number of companies began experimenting with the much more efficient motion-compensated block transform hybrid compression model for video coding.

In 1994, Richard Shaphorst (Delta Information Systems) took over new video coding development in ITU-T with the launch of the project for developing H.324. Schaphorst appointed Karel Rijkse (KPN Research) to chair the development of the H.263 video coding standard as part of that project. In 1996, Schaphorst then appointed Gary Sullivan (then of PictureTel, later 1999–2022 Microsoft, since 2023 Dolby) to launch the subsequent "H.263+" enhancement project. Effective in 1997, Sullivan was made rapporteur (chairman) of the question (group) for video coding in the ITU-T that is now called VCEG, then called Question 15 of Study Group 16. After the H.263+ project, which was completed in 1998, the group then completed an "H.263++" effort, produced H.263 Appendix III and H.263 Annex X, and launched the "H.26L" project with a call for proposals issued in January 1998 and a first draft design adopted in August 1999. In 2000, Thomas Wiegand (Fraunhofer HHI) was appointed as an associated rapporteur (vice-chairman) of VCEG. Sullivan and Wiegand led the H.26L project as it progressed to eventually become the H.264 standard after formation of a Joint Video Team (JVT) with MPEG in 2001, completing the first version of the standard in 2003. (In MPEG, the H.264 standard is known as MPEG-4 part 10.) After 2003, VCEG and the JVT developed several substantial extensions of H.264, produced H.271, and conducted exploration work toward the creation of a future new standard with better compression capability. Wiegand has remained an associated rapporteur of VCEG since that time. Question 15 was renumbered as Question 6 in 2005.

In July 2006, the video coding work of the ITU-T led by VCEG was voted as the most influential area of the standardization work of the CCITT and ITU-T in their 50-year history. The image coding work that is now in the domain of VCEG was also highly ranked in the voting, placing third overall.

In January 2010, the Joint Collaborative Team on Video Coding (JCT-VC) was created as a group of video coding experts from ITU-T Study Group 16 (VCEG) and ISO/IEC JTC 1/SC 29/WG 11 (MPEG) to develop a new generation video coding standard now known as High Efficiency Video Coding (HEVC, H.265, ISO/IEC 23008-2 and MPEG-H Part 2).

In July 2014, Jill Boyce (then of Vidyo, later Intel) was appointed as an additional associated rapporteur for VCEG. Boyce remained in that role for seven years, stepping down as associated rapporteur in June 2021.

In May 2015 the ITU celebrated its 150-year anniversary, and the work of VCEG was one of the five areas of standardization to be recognized by an "ITU 150 Award" as one of the most influential topics of ITU work.

VCEG and MPEG created another partnership called the Joint Video Exploration Team (JVET) in October 2015, later renaming it as the Joint Video Experts Team, which developed the Versatile Video Coding (VVC, H.266, ISO/IEC 23090-3 and MPEG-I Part 3) standard, completing the first version of the standard in July 2020.

In January 2022, Yan Ye (of Alibaba) was appointed as an associate rapporteur for VCEG.

In 2023, VCEG began considering standardization of coding technology for biomedical and other waveform signals in collaboration with DICOM Working Group 32 (Neurophysiology data).

In July 2026, VCEG again partnered with MPEG for JVET to issue a Joint Call for Proposals on video compression with capability beyond VVC.

== Video coding standards ==
The organization now known as VCEG has standardized (and is responsible for the maintenance of) the following video compression formats:

- H.120: the first digital video coding standard. v1 (1984) featured conditional replenishment, scalar quantization, differential PCM (DPCM), variable-length coding and a switch for quincunx sampling. v2 (1988) added motion compensation and background prediction. This standard was little-used and no operational codecs exist that use it.
- H.261: was the first practical digital video coding standard (late 1990). This design was a pioneering effort, based on motion-compensated discrete cosine transform (DCT) coding. All subsequent international video coding standards have been based closely on its design. MPEG-1 Part 2 was heavily influenced by this.
- H.262: it is identical in content to the video part of the ISO/IEC MPEG-2 Part 2 standard (ISO/IEC 13818-2). This standard was developed in a joint partnership between VCEG and MPEG, and thus it became published as a standard of both organizations. Recommendation ITU-T H.262 and ISO/IEC 13818-2 were developed and published as "common text" international standards. As a result, the two documents are completely identical in all aspects.
- H.263: was developed as an evolutionary improvement based on experience from H.261, and the MPEG-1 and MPEG-2 standards. Its first version was completed in 1995 and provided a suitable replacement for H.261 at all bitrates. MPEG-4 Part 2 is substantially similar to this.
- H.263v2: also known as H.263+ or as the 1998 version of H.263, is the informal name of the second edition of the H.263 international video coding standard. It retains the entire technical content of the original version of the standard, but enhances H.263 capabilities by adding several annexes which substantially improve encoding efficiency and provide other capabilities (such as enhanced robustness against data loss in the transmission channel). The H.263+ project was completed in late 1997 or early 1998, and was then followed by an "H.263++" project that added a few more enhancements in late 2000.
- H.264: Advanced Video Coding (AVC) is the most widely used standard in the series of international video coding standards. It was developed by a Joint Video Team (JVT) consisting of experts from ITU-T's Video Coding Experts Group (VCEG) and ISO/IEC's Moving Picture Experts Group (MPEG) created in 2001. The ITU-T H.264 standard and the ISO/IEC MPEG-4 Part 10 standard (formally, ISO/IEC 14496-10) are technically identical. The final drafting work on the first version of the standard was completed in May 2003. As has been the case with past standards, its design provides a balance between the coding efficiency, implementation complexity, and cost based on state of VLSI design technology (CPUs, DSPs, ASICs, FPGAs, etc.).
  - H.264.1: Conformance testing for H.264
  - H.264.2: Reference software for H.264
- H.265: High Efficiency Video Coding (HEVC), also known as ISO/IEC 23008-2 and MPEG-H Part 2, was completed in January 2013 for its first edition. HEVC has approximately twice the compression capability of its H.264/MPEG-4 AVC predecessor and was similarly developed with MPEG in a joint team known as the Joint Collaborative Team on Video Coding (JCT-VC).
  - H.265.1: Conformance testing for H.265
  - H.265.2: Reference software for H.265
- H.266: Versatile Video Coding (VVC), also known as ISO/IEC 23090-3 and MPEG-I Part 3, is a video compression standard finalized on 6 July 2020, by the Joint Video Experts Team (JVET), a joint video expert team of the VCEG working group of ITU-T Study Group 16 and the MPEG working group of ISO/IEC JTC 1. It is the successor to High Efficiency Video Coding (HEVC, also known as ITU-T H.265 and MPEG-H Part 2).
  - H.266.1: Conformance testing for H.266
  - H.266.2: Reference software for H.266

== Image coding standards ==
Starting in late 2006, VCEG has also been responsible for the ITU-T work on still image coding standards including the following:

- JPEG (ITU-T T.80, T.81, T.83, T.84, T.86, T.871, T.872 and T.873) and the JPEG-like ITU-T T.851
- JBIG-1 (ITU-T T.80, T.82 and T.85)
- JBIG-2 (ITU-T T.88 and T.89)
- JPEG-LS (ITU-T T.87 and T.870)
- JPEG 2000 (ITU-T T.800 through T.816)
- JPEG XR (ITU-T T.832, T.833, T.834, T.835, and T.Sup2)
- MRC (ITU-T T.44)

VCEG works on most of these image coding standards jointly with ISO/IEC JTC 1/SC 29/WG 1 (the Joint Photographic Experts Group/Joint Bi-level Image experts Group).

== Other related standards ==
- H.271: Video back channel messages for conveyance of status information and requests from a video receiver to a video sender
- H.272: Procedures and values for video gamma compensation in multimedia system
- H.273: Coding-independent code points (CICP) for video signal type identification, also ISO/IEC 23091-2
- H.274: Versatile supplemental enhancement information (VSEI) messages for coded video bitstreams, also ISO/IEC 23002-7

== See also ==
- ITU-T
- Joint Photographic Experts Group (JPEG)
- Moving Picture Experts Group (MPEG)
- Gary Sullivan (engineer)
- Video codec
- Video compression
- Video quality
