= Thomas Wiegand =

German electrical engineer (born 1970)

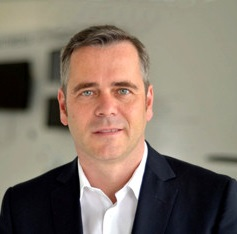
- Born: Thomas Wiegand; May 6, 1970 (age 56); Wismar, Bezirk Rostock, East Germany
- Citizenship: German
- Education: Hamburg University of Technology, University of Erlangen-Nuremberg
- Known for: H.264/MPEG-4 AVC video coding standard
- Awards: Primetime Emmy Engineering Award (2008), IEEE Masaru Ibuka Consumer Electronics Award (2012), ITU 150 Award (2015)
- Scientific career
- Fields: Electrical engineering
- Workplaces: Technische Universität Berlin, Fraunhofer Heinrich Hertz Institute

Thomas Wiegand (born 6 May 1970 in Wismar) is a German electrical engineer who substantially contributed to the creation of the H.264/AVC, H.265/HEVC, and H.266/VVC video coding standards. He has been elected to the German National Academy of Engineering (Acatech) and the National Academy of Science (Leopoldina).
For H.264/AVC, Wiegand was one of the chairmen of the Joint Video Team (JVT) standardization committee that created the standard and was the chief editor of the standard itself. He was also a very active technical contributor to the H.264/AVC, H.265/HEVC, and H.266/VVC video coding standards. Wiegand also holds a chairmanship position in the ITU-T VCEG of ITU-T Study Group 16 and previously in ISO/IEC MPEG standardization organizations. In July 2006, video coding work of the ITU-T was jointly led by Gary J. Sullivan and Wiegand for the preceding six years. It was voted as the most influential area of the standardization work of the CCITT and ITU-T in their 50-year history. Since 2018, Wiegand has served as chair of the ITU/WHO Focus Group on Artificial Intelligence for Health (FG-AI4H). Since 2014, Thomson Reuters named Wiegand in their list of “The World’s Most Influential Scientific Minds” as one of the most cited researchers in his field.

== Current work ==
Wiegand is professor at Technische Universität Berlin and executive director of the Fraunhofer Heinrich Hertz Institute, Berlin, Germany. He heads research teams working on:

- Video processing and coding
- Multimedia transmission
- Machine learning
- Mobile Communications (management)
- Computer Vision (management)

Since 2020 he is a principal scientist at the Berlin Institute for the Foundations of Learning and Data (BIFOLD).

== Early background ==
Thomas Wiegand was born in and spent his early life in East Germany. He decided to take an apprenticeship as an electrician instead of studying to avoid having to serve for three years in the National People's Army. After the "Wende" he started to study electrical engineering at the Hamburg University of Technology, where he earned his Diplom in 1995. In 2000, he earned his Ph.D. at the University of Erlangen-Nuremberg. As a student, he was a visiting researcher at Kobe University, Japan, the University of California at Santa Barbara and Stanford University, US, where he also returned as a visiting professor.

== Standardization ==
- Since 2000: Associated Rapporteur of VCEG (Video Coding Experts Group - ITU-T SG16 Q.6)
- Since 2001: Associated Rapporteur / Co-chair of JVT
- Since 2002: Editor of the H.264/AVC video coding standard and its extensions (FRExt and SVC)
- 2005-2009: Associated Chair of MPEG Video (Moving Pictures Experts Group - ISO/IEC JTC1/SC29/WG11)
- Since 2018: Chair of the ITU/WHO Focus Group on Artificial Intelligence for Health (FG-AI4H)

== Awards ==
- 1998: SPIE VCIP Best Student Paper Award (together with E. Steinbach, P. Eisert and B. Girod)
- 2004: Fraunhofer Award (together with D. Marpe and H. Schwarz)
- 2004: ITG Award of the German Society for Information Technology (together with D. Marpe and H. Schwarz)
- 2006: The video coding work of the ITU-T led by Gary Sullivan and Thomas Wiegand jointly since 2000 was voted as the most influential area of the standardization work of the CCITT and ITU-T in their 50-year history
- 2008: Primetime Emmy Engineering Award (awarded to the JVT standards committee by the Academy of Television Arts and Sciences for development of the High Profile of H.264/MPEG-4 AVC, for which Wiegand served as associated rapporteur/co-chair, editor, and technical contributor)
- 2009: Paired Technology & Engineering Emmy Awards (one awarded to VCEG and one to MPEG by the National Academy of Television Arts and Sciences for development of the H.264/MPEG-4 AVC standard)
- 2009: Group Technical Achievement Award of EURASIP (European Association for Signal Processing) for active contributions to video coding research and standardization activities
- 2009: Best Paper Award of IEEE Transactions on Circuits and Systems for Video Technology (together with H. Schwarz and D. Marpe)
- 2009: Innovation Award of Vodafone Foundation for Research in Mobile Communications
- 2010: Technology Award of Eduard Rhein Foundation (together with J.-R. Ohm)
- 2011: Fellow of the IEEE for contributions to video coding and its standardization
- 2011: Best Paper Award of EURASIP (European Association for Signal Processing) (together with K. Müller, A. Smolic, K. Dix, P. Merkle and P. Kauff)
- 2011: Karl Heinz Beckurts Award (together with H. Schwarz and D. Marpe)
- 2012: IEEE Masaru Ibuka Consumer Electronics Award - IEEE Technical Field Award
- 2013: Best Paper Award of IEEE Transactions on Circuits and Systems for Video Technology (together with G. J. Sullivan, J.-R. Ohm, and W.-J. Han)
- 2013: Best Journal Paper Award of the IEEE Communications Society MMTC (together with P. Ndjiki-Nya, M. Koppel, D. Doshkov, H. Lakshman, P. Merkle and K. Müller)
- 2013: International Multimedia Telecommunications Consortium (IMTC) Leadership Award
- 2013: Research Award for Technical Communication of Alcatel Lucent Foundation
- 2014: Best Paper Award of EURASIP (European Association for Signal Processing) (together with P. Merkle, Y. Morvan, A. Smolic, D. Farin, K. Müller and P.H.N. de With)
- 2014: Richard Theile Medal of the German Television and Cinema Technology Society
- 2015: ITU150 Award (the other ITU 150 awards went to Bill Gates, Robert E. Kahn, Mark I. Krivocheev, Martin Cooper, and Ken Sakamura)
- 2016: Elected member of the German National Academy of Engineering (Acatech)
- 2017: Primetime Emmy Engineering Award (awarded to the JCT-VC standards committee of VCEG and MPEG by the Academy of Television Arts and Sciences for development of the H.265/MPEG-H HEVC standard, for which Wiegand served as associated rapporteur of VCEG and technical contributor)
- 2018: Elected member of the German National Academy of Sciences (Leopoldina)
- 2019: Best Poster Presentation Paper Award, Picture Coding Symposium, Ningbo, China (PCS 2019) (together with W.-Q. Lim, H. Schwarz, D. Marpe)
- 2022: EURASIP Best Paper Award for the Signal Processing: Image Communication Journal (together with R. Reisenhofer, S. Bosse, G. Kutyniok)
- 2022: Fellow of the Information Technology Society in VDE (ITG) 2022, for his "outstanding achievements in the field of communications and information technology, noted by the entire professional community, in conjunction with [his] commitment to our professional society."
- 2024: IEEE SPS Best Paper Award (together with S. Bosse, D. Maniry, K.-R. Müller, and W. Samek)

== Other positions held ==
- 1993–1994: Visiting Researcher, Kobe University, Japan
- 1995: Visiting Scholar, University of California at Santa Barbara, U.S.
- 1997–1998: Visiting Researcher, Stanford University, California, USA
- 1997–1998: Consultant to 8x8 Inc., Santa Clara, California, USA
- 2006–2011: Member of technical advisory board, Vidyo, Inc., Hackensack, New Jersey, USA
- 2006–2008: Member of technical advisory board, Stream Processors, Inc., Sunnyvale, California, USA
- 2007–2009: Consultant, Skyfire, Inc. (acquired by Opera Software ASA), Mountain View, California, USA
- 2011–2012: Visiting professor, Stanford University, USA
