= Detlev Marpe =

Researcher

Detlev Marpe from the Fraunhofer Institute for Telecommunications in Berlin, Germany was named Fellow of the Institute of Electrical and Electronics Engineers (IEEE) in 2015 for contributions to video coding research and standardization.

Marpe obtained his Diplom in mathematics from Technische Universität Berlin and then got his Doktoringenieur degree in computer science from the University of Rostock. Currently he serves as head of the Department of Video Coding & Analytics and of Image & Video Coding Group at Fraunhofer Institute for Telecommunications. An author and co-author of more than 200 publications in the field of video coding and signal processing, Marpe also serves as associate editor of the IEEE Transactions on Circuits and Systems for Video Technology.
