= H.331 =

Videoconference broadcasting standard

H.331 is part of the ITU suite of standards for Video Teleconferencing. This standard was approved in 1993, and is used for broadcast of videoconferences, as opposed to point-to-point links.

A standard H.320 terminal (i.e. ISDN endpoint) can be modified to provide one-way point-to-multipoint data transmissions ("broadcasts"). These broadcasts can be likened to television broadcasts. H.331 specifies how H.320 terminals act in situations where there is no data path from receivers back to transmitters, making normal two-way negotiation impossible. In such a situation no MCU is needed.

Standard applications include:

- Educational Broadcasts (Classes, Campus Events...)
- Corporate Broadcasts (Shareholder Meetings, Public Relations...)
- Political Broadcasts

Often low-bit-rate digital satellite transmission is used for such services, with one uplink site sending H.320 video and many receiving stations.
