= H.320 =

- Narrow-band visual telephone systems and terminal equipment
- Status: Published
- Year started: 1990
- Latest version: (03/04); March 2004
- Organization: ITU-T
- Related standards: H.221, H.230, H.242, H.261, H.262, H.263, H.264, H.265
- Website: https://www.itu.int/rec/T-REC-H.320

H.320 or Narrow-band visual telephone systems and terminal equipment is an umbrella Recommendation by the ITU-T for running multimedia (audio/video/data) over ISDN based networks. The main protocols in this suite are H.221, H.230, H.242, audio codecs such as G.711 (PCM) and G.728 (CELP), and discrete cosine transform (DCT) video codecs such as H.261 and H.263.

It is formally named as Narrow-band visual telephone systems and terminal equipment. It specifies technical requirements for narrow-band visual telephone systems and terminal equipment, typically for videoconferencing and videophone services. It describes a generic system configuration consisting of a number of elements which are specified by respective ITU-T Recommendations, definition of communication modes and terminal types, call control arrangements, terminal aspects and interworking requirements.

The service requirements for visual telephone services are presented in ITU-T Recs F.720 for videotelephony and F.702 for videoconference. Video and audio coding systems and other technical aspects common to audiovisual services are covered in other Recommendations in the H.200/F.700-series.

Narrow-band for this specification is defined as bit rates ranging from 64 kbit/s to 1920 kbit/s. This channel capacity may be provided as a single B/H0/H11/H12-channel or multiple B/H0-channels in ISDN.

Used video codecs: H.261, and optionally H.262, H.263, H.264 according to the video hierarchy specified in specification, and in ITU-T Recs H.241 and H.242. H.261 is mandatory in any enhanced H.320 system with video capability. Baseline H.263 capability shall be required in systems that use enhanced video modes.

Used audio codecs: G.711, and optionally G.722, G.728, G.723.1, G.729. (Example of usage: If a visual telephone interworks with a wideband speech terminal, G.722 audio may be used instead of G.711 audio.)

== See also ==
- H.323
- H.324
- H.331
