= H.262/MPEG-2 Part 2 =

Video compression format, succeeds MPEG-1

H.262 / MPEG-2 Part 2
- Information technology – Generic coding of moving pictures and associated audio information: Video
- Status: In force
- Year started: 1995
- First published: May 1996
- Latest version: ISO/IEC 13818-2:2013; October 2013
- Organization: ITU-T, ISO/IEC JTC 1
- Committee: ITU-T Study Group 16 VCEG, MPEG
- Base standards: H.261, MPEG-2
- Related standards: H.222.0, H.263, H.264, H.265, H.266, ISO/IEC 14496-2
- Predecessor: H.261
- Successor: H.263 (for low-bitrate/low-bandwidth) and H.264 (high-bandwidth video)
- Domain: Video compression
- License: Expired patents
- Website: https://www.itu.int/rec/T-REC-H.262

H.262 or MPEG-2 Part 2 (formally known as ITU-T Recommendation H.262 and ISO/IEC 13818-2, also known as MPEG-2 Video) is a video coding format standardised and jointly maintained by ITU-T Study Group 16 Video Coding Experts Group (VCEG) and ISO/IEC Moving Picture Experts Group (MPEG), and developed with the involvement of many companies. It is the second part of the ISO/IEC MPEG-2 standard. The ITU-T Recommendation H.262 and ISO/IEC 13818-2 documents are identical.

The standard is available for a fee from the ITU-T and ISO. MPEG-2 Video is very similar to MPEG-1, but also provides support for interlaced video (an encoding technique used in analog NTSC, PAL and SECAM television systems). MPEG-2 video is not optimized for low bit-rates (e.g., less than 1 Mbit/s), but somewhat outperforms MPEG-1 at higher bit rates (e.g., 3 Mbit/s and above), although not by a large margin unless the video is interlaced. All standards-conforming MPEG-2 Video decoders are also fully capable of playing back MPEG-1 Video streams.

== History ==
The ISO/IEC approval process was completed in November 1994. The first edition was approved in July 1995 and published by ITU-T and ISO/IEC in 1996. Didier LeGall of Bellcore chaired the development of the standard and Sakae Okubo of NTT was the ITU-T coordinator and chaired the agreements on its requirements.

The technology was developed with contributions from a number of companies. Hyundai Electronics (now SK Hynix) developed the first MPEG-2 SAVI (System/Audio/Video) decoder in 1995.

The majority of patents that were later asserted in a patent pool to be essential for implementing the standard came from three companies: Sony (311 patents), Thomson (198 patents) and Mitsubishi Electric (119 patents).

In 1996, it was extended by two amendments to include the registration of copyright identifiers and the 4:2:2 Profile. ITU-T published these amendments in 1996 and ISO in 1997.

There are also other amendments published later by ITU-T and ISO/IEC. The most recent edition of the standard was published in 2013 and incorporates all prior amendments.

=== Editions ===
H.262 / MPEG-2 Video editions
| Edition | Release date | Latest amendment | ISO/IEC standard | ITU-T Recommendation |
|---|---|---|---|---|
| First edition | 1995 | 2000 | ISO/IEC 13818-2:1996 | H.262 (07/95) |
| Second edition | 2000 | 2010 | ISO/IEC 13818-2:2000 | H.262 (02/00) |
| Third edition | 2013 | | ISO/IEC 13818-2:2013 | H.262 (02/12), incorporating Amendment 1 (03/13) |

== Video coding ==
=== Picture sampling ===
An HDTV camera with 8-bit sampling generates a raw video stream of 25 × 1920 × 1080 × 3 = 155,520,000 bytes per second for 25 frame-per-second video (using the 4:4:4 sampling format). This stream of data must be compressed if digital TV is to fit in the bandwidth of available TV channels and if movies are to fit on DVDs. Video compression is practical because the data in pictures is often redundant in space and time. For example, the sky can be blue across the top of a picture and that blue sky can persist for frame after frame. Also, because of the way the eye works, it is possible to delete or approximate some data from video pictures with little or no noticeable degradation in image quality.

A common (and old) trick to reduce the amount of data is to separate each complete "frame" of video into two "fields" upon broadcast/encoding: the "top field", which is the odd numbered horizontal lines, and the "bottom field", which is the even numbered lines. Upon reception/decoding, the two fields are displayed alternately with the lines of one field interleaving between the lines of the previous field; this format is called interlaced video. The typical field rate is 50 (Europe/PAL) or 59.94 (US/NTSC) fields per second, corresponding to 25 (Europe/PAL) or 29.97 (North America/NTSC) whole frames per second. If the video is not interlaced, then it is called progressive scan video and each picture is a complete frame. MPEG-2 supports both options.

Digital television requires that these pictures be digitized so that they can be processed by computer hardware. Each picture element (a pixel) is then represented by one luma number and two chroma numbers. These describe the brightness and the color of the pixel (see YCbCr). Thus, each digitized picture is initially represented by three rectangular arrays of numbers.

Another common practice to reduce the amount of data to be processed is to subsample the two chroma planes (after low-pass filtering to avoid aliasing). This works because the human visual system better resolves details of brightness than details in the hue and saturation of colors. The term 4:2:2 is used for video with the chroma subsampled by a ratio of 2:1 horizontally, and 4:2:0 is used for video with the chroma subsampled by 2:1 both vertically and horizontally. Video that has luma and chroma at the same resolution is called 4:4:4. The MPEG-2 Video document considers all three sampling types, although 4:2:0 is by far the most common for consumer video, and there are no defined "profiles" of MPEG-2 for 4:4:4 video (see below for further discussion of profiles).

While the discussion below in this section generally describes MPEG-2 video compression, there are many details that are not discussed, including details involving fields, chrominance formats, responses to scene changes, special codes that label the parts of the bitstream, and other pieces of information. Aside from features for handling fields for interlaced coding, MPEG-2 Video is very similar to MPEG-1 Video (and even quite similar to the earlier H.261 standard), so the entire description below applies equally well to MPEG-1.

=== I-frames, P-frames, and B-frames ===
MPEG-2 includes three basic types of coded frames: intra-coded frames (I-frames), predictive-coded frames (P-frames), and bidirectionally-predictive-coded frames (B-frames).

An I-frame is a separately-compressed version of a single uncompressed (raw) frame. The coding of an I-frame takes advantage of spatial redundancy and of the inability of the eye to detect certain changes in the image. Unlike P-frames and B-frames, I-frames do not depend on data in the preceding or the following frames, and so their coding is very similar to how a still photograph would be coded (roughly similar to JPEG picture coding). Briefly, the raw frame is divided into 8 pixel by 8 pixel blocks. The data in each block is transformed by the discrete cosine transform (DCT). The result is an 8×8 matrix of coefficients that have real number values. The transform converts spatial variations into frequency variations, but it does not change the information in the block; if the transform is computed with perfect precision, the original block can be recreated exactly by applying the inverse cosine transform (also with perfect precision). The conversion from 8-bit integers to real-valued transform coefficients actually expands the amount of data used at this stage of the processing, but the advantage of the transformation is that the image data can then be approximated by quantizing the coefficients. Many of the transform coefficients, usually the higher frequency components, will be zero after the quantization, which is basically a rounding operation. The penalty of this step is the loss of some subtle distinctions in brightness and color. The quantization may either be coarse or fine, as selected by the encoder. If the quantization is not too coarse and one applies the inverse transform to the matrix after it is quantized, one gets an image that looks very similar to the original image but is not quite the same. Next, the quantized coefficient matrix is itself compressed. Typically, one corner of the 8×8 array of coefficients contains only zeros after quantization is applied. By starting in the opposite corner of the matrix, then zigzagging through the matrix to combine the coefficients into a string, then substituting run-length codes for consecutive zeros in that string, and then applying Huffman coding to that result, one reduces the matrix to a smaller quantity of data. It is this entropy coded data that is broadcast or that is put on DVDs. In the receiver or the player, the whole process is reversed, enabling the receiver to reconstruct, to a close approximation, the original frame.

The processing of B-frames is similar to that of P-frames except that B-frames use the picture in a subsequent reference frame as well as the picture in a preceding reference frame. As a result, B-frames usually provide more compression than P-frames. B-frames are never reference frames in MPEG-2 Video.

Typically, every 15th frame or so is made into an I-frame. P-frames and B-frames might follow an I-frame like this, IBBPBBPBBPBB(I), to form a Group of Pictures (GOP); however, the standard is flexible about this. The encoder selects which pictures are coded as I-, P-, and B-frames.

=== Macroblocks ===
P-frames provide more compression than I-frames because they take advantage of the data in a previous I-frame or P-frame – a reference frame. To generate a P-frame, the previous reference frame is reconstructed, just as it would be in a TV receiver or DVD player. The frame being compressed is divided into 16 pixel by 16 pixel macroblocks. Then, for each of those macroblocks, the reconstructed reference frame is searched to find a 16 by 16 area that closely matches the content of the macroblock being compressed. The offset is encoded as a "motion vector". Frequently, the offset is zero, but if something in the picture is moving, the offset might be something like 23 pixels to the right and 4-and-a-half pixels up. In MPEG-1 and MPEG-2, motion vector values can either represent integer offsets or half-integer offsets. The match between the two regions will often not be perfect. To correct for this, the encoder takes the difference of all corresponding pixels of the two regions, and on that macroblock difference then computes the DCT and strings of coefficient values for the four 8×8 areas in the 16×16 macroblock as described above. This "residual" is appended to the motion vector and the result sent to the receiver or stored on the DVD for each macroblock being compressed. Sometimes no suitable match is found. Then, the macroblock is treated like an I-frame macroblock.

== Video profiles and levels ==
MPEG-2 video supports a wide range of applications from mobile to high quality HD editing. For many applications, it is unrealistic and too expensive to support the entire standard. To allow such applications to support only subsets of it, the standard defines profiles and levels.

A profile defines sets of features such as B-pictures, 3D video, chroma format, etc. The level limits the memory and processing power needed, defining maximum bit rates, frame sizes, and frame rates.

A MPEG application then specifies the capabilities in terms of profile and level. For example, a DVD player may say it supports up to main profile and main level (often written as MP@ML). It means the player can play back any MPEG stream encoded as MP@ML or less.

The tables below summarizes the limitations of each profile and level, though there are constraints not listed here. Note that not all profile and level combinations are permissible, and scalable modes modify the level restrictions.

MPEG-2 Profiles
| Abbr. | Name | Picture Coding Types | Chroma Format | Scalable modes | Intra DC Precision |
|---|---|---|---|---|---|
| SP | Simple profile | I, P | 4:2:0 | none | 8, 9, 10 |
| MP | Main profile | I, P, B | 4:2:0 | none | 8, 9, 10 |
| SNR | SNR Scalable profile | I, P, B | 4:2:0 | SNR (Note: SNR-scalability sends the transform-domain differences to a lower quantization level of each block, raising the quality and bitrate when both streams are combined. A main stream can be recreated losslessly.) | 8, 9, 10 |
| Spatial | Spatially Scalable profile | I, P, B | 4:2:0 | SNR, spatial (Note: Spatial-scalability encodes the difference between the HD and the upscaled SD streams, which is combined with the SD to recreate the HD stream. A Main stream cannot be recreated losslessly.) | 8, 9, 10 |
| HP | High-profile | I, P, B | 4:2:2 or 4:2:0 | SNR, spatial | 8, 9, 10, 11 |
| 422 | 4:2:2 profile | I, P, B | 4:2:2 or 4:2:0 | none | 8, 9, 10, 11 |
| MVP | Multi-view profile | I, P, B | 4:2:0 | Temporal (Note: Temporal-scalability inserts extra frames between every base frame, to raise the frame rate or add a 3D viewpoint. This is the only MPEG-2 profile allowing adaptive frame references, a prominent feature of H.264/AVC. A Main stream may be recreated losslessly only if extended references are not used.) | 8, 9, 10 |

MPEG-2 Levels
| Abbr. | Name | Frame rates (Hz) | Max resolution | | Max luminance samples per second (approximately height x width x framerate) | Max bit rate MP@ (Mbit/s) |
| Abbr. | Name | Frame rates (Hz) | horizontal | vertical | Max luminance samples per second (approximately height x width x framerate) | Max bit rate MP@ (Mbit/s) |
|---|---|---|---|---|---|---|
| LL | Low Level | 23.976, 24, 25, 29.97, 30 | 352 | 288 | 3,041,280 | 4 |
| ML | Main Level | 23.976, 24, 25, 29.97, 30 | 720 | 576 | 10,368,000, except in High-profile: constraint is 14,475,600 for 4:2:0 and 11,059,200 for 4:2:2 | 15 |
| H-14 | High 1440 | 23.976, 24, 25, 29.97, 30, 50, 59.94, 60 | 1440 | 1152 | 47,001,600, except in High-profile: constraint is 62,668,800 for 4:2:0 | 60 |
| HL | High Level | 23.976, 24, 25, 29.97, 30, 50, 59.94, 60 | 1920 | 1152 | 62,668,800, except in High-profile: constraint is 83,558,400 for 4:2:0 | 80 |

A few common MPEG-2 Profile/Level combinations are presented below, with particular maximum limits noted:

| Profile @ Level | Resolution (px) | Framerate max. (Hz) | Sampling | Bitrate (Mbit/s) | Example Application |
|---|---|---|---|---|---|
| SP@LL | 176 × 144 | 15 | 4:2:0 | 0.096 | Wireless handsets |
| SP@ML | 352 × 288 | 15 | 4:2:0 | 0.384 | PDAs |
| SP@ML | 320 × 240 | 24 | 4:2:0 | 0.384 | PDAs |
| MP@LL | 352 × 288 | 30 | 4:2:0 | 4 | Set-top boxes (STB) |
| MP@ML | 720 × 480 | 30 | 4:2:0 | 15 | DVD (9.8 Mbit/s), SD DVB (15 Mbit/s) |
| MP@ML | 720 × 576 | 25 | 4:2:0 | 15 | DVD (9.8 Mbit/s), SD DVB (15 Mbit/s) |
| MP@H-14 | 1440 × 1080 | 30 | 4:2:0 | 60 | HDV (25 Mbit/s) |
| MP@H-14 | 1280 × 720 | 30 | 4:2:0 | 60 | HDV (25 Mbit/s) |
| MP@HL | 1920 × 1080 | 30 | 4:2:0 | 80 | ATSC (18.3 Mbit/s), SD DVB (31 Mbit/s), HD DVB (50.3 Mbit/s) |
| MP@HL | 1280 × 720 | 60 | 4:2:0 | 80 | ATSC (18.3 Mbit/s), SD DVB (31 Mbit/s), HD DVB (50.3 Mbit/s) |
| 422P@ML | 720 × 480 | 30 | 4:2:2 | 50 | Sony IMX (I only), Broadcast Contribution (I&P only) |
| 422P@ML | 720 × 576 | 25 | 4:2:2 | 50 | Sony IMX (I only), Broadcast Contribution (I&P only) |
| 422P@H-14 | 1440 × 1080 | 30 | 4:2:2 | 80 | |
| 422P@HL | 1920 × 1080 | 30 | 4:2:2 | 300 | Sony MPEG HD422 (50 Mbit/s), Canon XF Codec (50 Mbit/s), Convergent Design Nanoflash recorder (up to 160 Mbit/s) |
| 422P@HL | 1280 × 720 | 60 | 4:2:2 | 300 | Sony MPEG HD422 (50 Mbit/s), Canon XF Codec (50 Mbit/s), Convergent Design Nanoflash recorder (up to 160 Mbit/s) |

== Applications ==
Some applications are listed below.

- DVD-Video – a standard definition consumer video format. Uses 4:2:0 color subsampling and variable video data rate up to 9.8 Mbit/s.
- MPEG IMX – a standard definition professional video recording format. Uses intraframe compression, 4:2:2 color subsampling and user-selectable constant video data rate of 30, 40 or 50 Mbit/s.
- HDV – a tape-based high definition video recording format. Uses 4:2:0 color subsampling and 19.4 or 25 Mbit/s total data rate.
- XDCAM – a family of tapeless video recording formats, which, in particular, includes formats based on MPEG-2 Part 2. These are: standard definition MPEG IMX (see above), high definition MPEG HD, high definition MPEG HD422. MPEG IMX and MPEG HD422 employ 4:2:2 color subsampling, MPEG HD employs 4:2:0 color subsampling. Most subformats use selectable constant video data rate from 25 to 50 Mbit/s, although there is also a variable bitrate mode with maximum 18 Mbit/s data rate.
- XF Codec – a professional tapeless video recording format, similar to MPEG HD and MPEG HD422 but stored in a different container file.
- HD DVD – defunct high definition consumer video format.
- Blu-ray Disc – high definition consumer video format.
- Broadcast TV – in some countries MPEG-2 Part 2 is used for digital broadcast in high definition. For example, ATSC specifies both several scanning formats (480i, 480p, 720p, 1080i, 1080p) and frame/field rates at 4:2:0 color subsampling, with up to 19.4 Mbit/s data rate per channel.
- Digital cable TV
- Satellite TV

== Patent holders ==
The following organizations have held patents for MPEG-2 video technology, as listed at MPEG LA. All of these patents are now expired in the US and most other territories.

| Organization | Patents |
|---|---|
| Sony | 311 |
| Thomson Licensing | 198 |
| Mitsubishi Electric | 119 |
| Philips | 99 |
| GE Technology Development, Inc. | 75 |
| Panasonic Corporation | 55 |
| CIF Licensing, LLC | 44 |
| JVC Kenwood | 39 |
| Samsung Electronics | 38 |
| Alcatel Lucent (including Multimedia Patent Trust) | 33 |
| Cisco Technology, Inc. | 13 |
| Toshiba Corporation | 9 |
| Columbia University | 9 |
| LG Electronics | 8 |
| Hitachi | 7 |
| Orange S.A. | 7 |
| Fujitsu | 6 |
| Robert Bosch GmbH | 5 |
| General Instrument | 4 |
| British Telecommunications | 3 |
| Canon Inc. | 2 |
| KDDI Corporation | 2 |
| Nippon Telegraph and Telephone (NTT) | 2 |
| ARRIS Technology, Inc. | 2 |
| Sanyo Electric | 1 |
| Sharp Corporation | 1 |
| Hewlett-Packard Enterprise Company | 1 |
