= Sum of absolute transformed differences =

The sum of absolute transformed differences (SATD) is a block matching criterion widely used in fractional motion estimation for video compression. It works by taking a frequency transform, usually a Hadamard transform, of the differences between the pixels in the original block and the corresponding pixels in the block being used for comparison. The transform itself is often of a small block rather than the entire macroblock. For example, in x264, a series of 4×4 blocks are transformed rather than doing the more processor-intensive 16×16 transform.

== Comparison to other metrics ==
SATD is slower than the sum of absolute differences (SAD), both due to its increased complexity and the fact that SAD-specific MMX and SSE2 instructions exist, while there are no such instructions for SATD. However, SATD can still be optimized considerably with SIMD instructions on most modern CPUs. The benefit of SATD is that it more accurately models the number of bits required to transmit the residual error signal. As such, it is often used in video compressors, either as a way to drive and estimate rate explicitly, such as in the Theora encoder (since 1.1 alpha2), as an optional metric used in wide motion searches, such as in the Microsoft VC-1 encoder, or as a metric used in sub-pixel refinement, such as in x264.

== See also ==
- Hadamard transform
- Motion compensation
- Motion estimation
- Rate–distortion optimization
- Sum of absolute differences
