= Sum of absolute differences =

Digital image processing measure

In digital image processing, the sum of absolute differences (SAD) is a measure of the similarity between image blocks. It is calculated by taking the absolute difference between each pixel in the original block and the corresponding pixel in the block being used for comparison. These differences are summed to create a simple metric of block similarity, the L^{1} norm of the difference image or Manhattan distance between two image blocks.

The sum of absolute differences may be used for a variety of purposes, such as object recognition, the generation of disparity maps for stereo images, and motion estimation for video compression.

== Example ==
This example uses the sum of absolute differences to identify which part of a search image is most similar to a template image. In this example, the template image is 3 by 3 pixels in size, while the search image is 3 by 5 pixels in size. Each pixel is represented by a single integer from 0 to 9.

Template    Search image
 2 5 5       2 7 5 8 6
 4 0 7       1 7 4 2 7
 7 5 9       8 4 6 8 5

There are exactly three unique locations within the search image where the template may fit: the left side of the image, the center of the image, and the right side of the image. To calculate the SAD values, the absolute value of the difference between each corresponding pair of pixels is used: the difference between 2 and 2 is 0, 4 and 1 is 3, 7 and 8 is 1, and so forth.

Calculating the values of the absolute differences for each pixel, for the three possible template locations, gives the following:

Left    Center   Right
0 2 0   5 0 3    3 3 1
3 7 3   3 4 5    0 2 0
1 1 3   3 1 1    1 3 4

For each of these three image patches, the 9 absolute differences are added together, giving SAD values of 20, 25, and 17, respectively. From these SAD values, it could be asserted that the right side of the search image is the most similar to the template image, because it has the lowest sum of absolute differences as compared to the other two locations.

== Comparison to other metrics ==
=== Object recognition ===
The sum of absolute differences provides a simple way to automate the searching for objects inside an image, but may be unreliable due to the effects of contextual factors such as changes in lighting, color, viewing direction, size, or shape. The SAD may be used in conjunction with other object recognition methods, such as edge detection, to improve the reliability of results.

=== Video compression ===
SAD is an extremely fast metric due to its simplicity; it is effectively the simplest possible metric that takes into account every pixel in a block. Therefore, it is very effective for a wide motion search of many different blocks. SAD is also easily parallelizable since it analyzes each pixel separately, making it easily implementable with such instructions as ARM NEON or x86 SSE2. For example, SSE has packed sum of absolute differences instruction (PSADBW) specifically for this purpose. Once candidate blocks are found, the final refinement of the motion estimation process is often done with other slower but more accurate metrics, which better take into account human perception. These include the sum of absolute transformed differences (SATD), the sum of squared differences (SSD), and rate–distortion optimization.

== See also ==
- Computer stereo vision
- Hadamard transform
- Motion compensation
- Motion estimation
- Object recognition (computer vision)
- Rate–distortion optimization
