= Never Been Seen =

British Science Museum webtool

Never Been Seen is a webtool launched in 2021, and created by the British Science Museum Group, designed to display images of objects in its collection which have never been viewed online since being photographed and published online by the museum.

== Background ==
The Science Museum Group is a group of five science museums based in Britain. Due to the COVID-19 pandemic, all museums in the group were closed in 2020, and began to "digitally re-open" from January 2021, with new online tools and exhibits.

In 2019, the group had begun digitising its entire image collection due to imminent relocation and, as of 2020, had digitised 100,000 images of objects. The museum archivists also found that many of the images had never been seen, even by themselves, as much of the digitisation process had been automated. As a result, the Never Been Seen tool was created, both to promote the collections of the group and to bring items to the public that had never before been displayed.

== Function ==
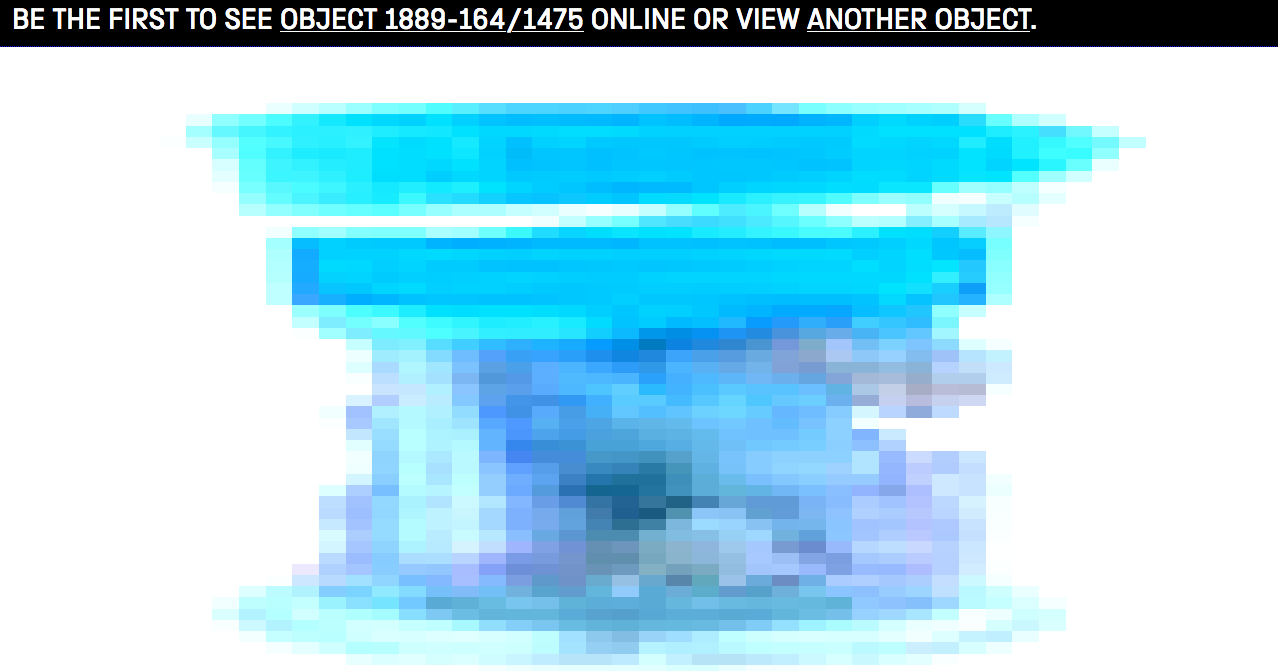
A pixelated image on the Never Been Seen website

The Never Been Seen website operates on GitHub and shows visitors a pixelated and colour adjusted version of one of its images that has not been viewed. Visitors can then choose to be the first to see the image, or to see a different one. The website only options images with a view count of zero on the collection website, and so each is removed after someone chooses to view it. All the images not only show objects, but have historical significance in and of themselves, and the tool takes visitors to the collection website where they see the image and read the details and stories relating to it.

Other digital tools that the group had previously launched also promoted images from the collection, with a different functionality, including a random object generator and a browser plug-in that shows an image when new tabs are opened.

== Response ==
MuseumNext suggested that since it was not possible at the time of the website's release in 2021 to physically visit museums and stumble upon new discoveries, the website provides the joy of finding things that someone has not been looking for, as well as "[functioning] as an almost infinite resource of visual inspiration."
