= IFD =

IFD may stand for:

== Culture ==
- I Fight Dragons, a Chicago-based band
- Independent Film Distributors, UK

== Technology ==
- I-Frame Delay, in MPEG video
- Image File Directory, in the Exchangeable image file format (Exif)
- Interface Device, often used in relation to Junos OS

== Organisations ==
- Indianapolis Fire Department, Indiana, US
- Information Flow Diagram

== Other uses ==
- Ideal free distribution, of animals around resources
- Ilford railway station, England, station code
- Indentation force deflection, test of memory foam
