= HDX4 =

HDX4 is an MPEG-4 codec developed by a German company named Jomigo Visual Technology. Benchmark tests of c't (a renowned German computer magazine), issue 05/2005 and Doom9.org showed that it was the fastest codec among the ones tested, with the disadvantage of a slightly lesser encoding efficiency. It is, among others, compatible with DivX, Xvid and Nero Digital.

The MPEG-4 implementation in HDX4 follows the specification guidelines of ISO/IEC 14496-2, also known as Simple Profile and Advanced Simple Profile.

The HDX4 codec comes bundled with the "HDX4 Movie Creator" suite, which claims to be optimized especially for the creation of videos for portable devices, but which is also capable of creating professional video content in High Definition or for streaming purposes in MP4.

The codec is more widely used in commercial fields, for example at Lufthansa, a German airline, and the Fraunhofer IGD in Darmstadt, Germany. Fraunhofer IGD employs HDX4 for its video conferencing system Communitrust. Apart from the commercial field, there are also various consumer applications that can make use of the HDX4 codec, due to its support of proprietary Microsoft Windows interfaces. By using an application such as MovieJack, the HDX4 codec can be used to convert a variety of video formats into content that is suitable for playback on mobile phones (3GPP), iPod or the PlayStation Portable.

In addition to the plain HDX4 codec, there are also several SDKs available, these encapsulate functionalities including the creation of content in MPEG-4, H.264, AAC, AMR-NB, G.726, 3GP, MP4, ASF formats and containers, as well as special functions such as dynamic upscaling and picture optimization.

== Products ==
- HDX4 Player
- HDX4 Movie Creator
- HDX4 SDKs
