= Range segmentation =

Range segmentation is the task of segmenting (dividing) a range image, an image containing depth information for each pixel, into segments (regions), so that all the points of the same surface belong to the same region, there is no overlap between different regions and the union of these regions generates the entire image.

== Algorithmic approaches ==
There have been two main approaches to the range segmentation problem: region-based range segmentation and edge-based range segmentation.

=== Region-based range segmentation ===
Region-based range segmentation algorithms can be further categorized into two major groups: parametric model-based range segmentation algorithms and region-growing algorithms.

Algorithms of the first group are based on assuming a parametric surface model and grouping data points so that all of them can be considered as points of a surface from the assumed parametric model (an instance of that model).

Region-growing algorithms start by segmenting an image into initial regions. These regions are then merged or extended by employing a region growing strategy. The initial regions can be obtained using different methods, including iterative or random methods. A drawback of algorithms of this group is that in general they produce distorted boundaries because the segmentation usually is carried out at region level instead of pixel level.

=== Edge-based range segmentation ===
Edge-based range segmentation algorithms are based on edge detection and labeling edges using the jump boundaries (discontinuities). They apply an edge detector to extract edges from a range image. Once boundaries are extracted, edges with common properties are clustered together. A typical example of edge-based range segmentation algorithms is presented by Fan et al. The segmentation procedure starts by detecting discontinuities using zero-crossing and curvature values. The image is segmented at discontinuities to obtain an initial segmentation. At the next step, the initial segmentation is refined by fitting quadratics whose coefficients are calculated based on the Least squares method. In general, a drawback of edge-based range segmentation algorithms is that although they produce clean and well defined boundaries between different regions, they tend to produce gaps between boundaries. In addition, for curved surfaces, discontinuities are smooth and hard to locate and therefore these algorithms tend to under-segment the range image. Although the range image segmentation problem has been studied for a number of years, the task of segmenting range images of curved surfaces is yet to be satisfactorily resolved.

== See also ==
- Image segmentation
- Image-based meshing
- Quantization (image processing)
