= Pixelation =

Computer graphics artifact

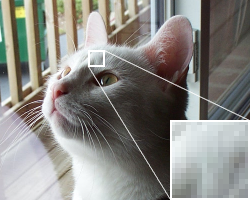
An example of pixelation. The image looks smooth when zoomed out, but when a small section is viewed more closely, the eye can distinguish individual pixels.

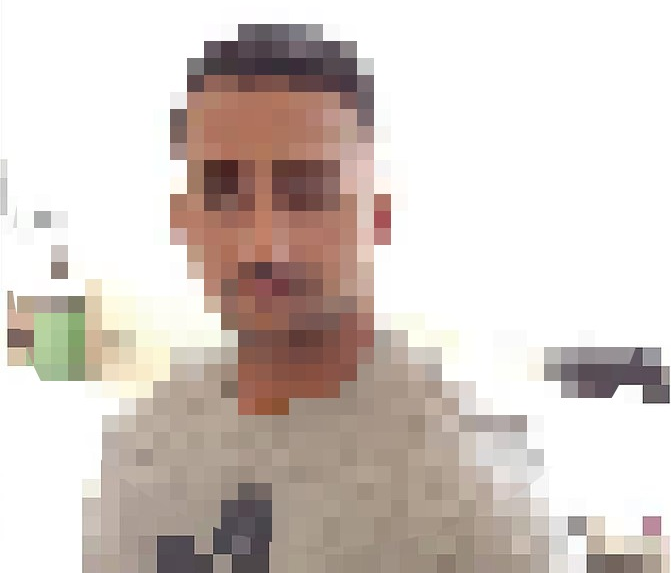
Pixelated image of a face

In computer graphics, pixelation (also spelled pixellation in British English) is caused by displaying a bitmap or a section of a bitmap at such a large size that individual pixels, small single-colored square display elements that comprise the bitmap, are visible. Such an image is said to be pixelated (pixellated in the UK).

A diamond without (left) and with (right) anti-aliasing

Early graphical applications such as video games ran at very low resolutions with a small number of colors, resulting in easily visible pixels. The resulting sharp edges gave curved objects and diagonal lines an unnatural appearance. However, when the number of available colors increased to 256, it was possible to gainfully employ anti-aliasing to smooth the appearance of low-resolution objects, not eliminating pixelation but making it less jarring to the eye. Higher resolutions would soon make this type of pixelation all but invisible on the screen, but pixelation is still visible if a low-resolution image is printed on paper.

In the realm of real-time 3D computer graphics, pixelation can be a problem. Here, bitmaps are applied to polygons as textures. As a camera approaches a textured polygon, simplistic nearest neighbor texture filtering would simply zoom in on the bitmap, creating drastic pixelation. The most common solution is a technique called pixel interpolation that smoothly blends or interpolates the color of one pixel into the color of the next adjacent pixel at high levels of zoom. This creates a more organic, but also much blurrier image.

Pixelation is a problem unique to bitmaps. Alternatives such as vector graphics or purely geometric polygon models can scale to any level of detail. This is one reason vector graphics are popular for printing – most modern computer monitors have a resolution of about 100 dots per inch, and at 300 dots per inch printed documents have about nine times as many pixels per unit of area as a screen. Another solution sometimes used is procedural textures, textures such as fractals that can be generated on-the-fly at arbitrary levels of detail.

The zoomed portion of the cat image above, resized using nearest neighbor (left) and with Adobe Photoshop's bicubic resampling, which uses pixel interpolation (right). The interpolated image has no sharp edges, but is considerably blurrier.

== Deliberate pixelation ==
In some cases, the resolution of an image or a portion of an image is lowered to introduce pixelation deliberately. This effect is commonly used on television news shows to obscure a person's face in order to protect their privacy or to censor nudity or vulgar gestures, and is also used for artistic effect. This effect is called pixelization. Making pixels easily visible is also a main feature in pixel art which is where the graphics are made in low resolutions for effect.

== Depixelization ==
Depixelization removes pixelization from images, attempting to reconstruct the appearance of the original (unpixelated) image.

== See also ==
- Colour banding
- Macroblocking
- Posterization
- Pixel art
