= Press videoconferencing =

Press videoconferencing is a press conference held over the Internet using videoconferencing (a form of teleconference). Journalists can participate in a press videoconference from anywhere without leaving their offices or their countries. They need only appear in front of a computer connected to the Internet via video link and ask their questions to the speaker by using a microphone to join the discussion.

This concept was developed in October 2007 by WEBOconference, a videoconferencing service provider, and the PanAfrican Press Association (APPA) to allow African journalists to participate in international press conferences on the subject of development and good governance.

== History ==
In 2008, the press videoconference service of the African Press Organization was used by the United-Nations Secretary General, Jean-Marie GUEHENNO, by General Director for Development of the European Commission, the President of the African Parliament, by the Head of communications of the African Development Bank, the Secretary General of the International Telecommunication Union, by the United Nations Special Reporter on contemporary forms of racisms, the African Director of the United Nations for the development (PNUD), by the United Nations speaker for the Bureau of Humanitarian Affairs in Chad, the African Bureau of the International Monetary Fund (IMF), or by the United-Nations Official Representative for children (UNICEF) in Tchad.

In February 2009, the African Press Organization’s Secretary-General, Nicolas Pompigne-Mognard, has declared that his non-governmental organization was anticipating a significant increase in demands for international press videoconferences because of the global economics crisis which limits journalists in their ability to find time and resources to travel.

== See also ==
- African politics
- News conference
- Teleconference
- Videotelephony
