= TeleCon =

TeleCon was, in its time, the world's largest conference and trade show on all forms of teleconferencing, videoconferencing, internet streaming, collaborative computing technologies, and their applications in distance education, corporate training, business collaboration, remote work, and telemedicine.

TeleCon XVIII was arranged in 1998 by Applied Business TeleCommunications owned and operated by Patrick Portway and Shawn Portway , which makes it reasonable to suppose that the first show was arranged in 1980.

The show was sold in 1998 and changed its name to "Collaborate West" in 2002, seeing a quite small turnout; there was also a "Collaborate Conference & Expo East 2002". It does not seem to have been arranged in 2003 under either name.
