= Project DIANE =

Project DIANE, an acronym for Diversified Information and Assistance NEtwork, was a very early videoconferencing based community service network created in the United States. DIANE was a grassroots driven regional videoconferencing consortium which promoted and supported cooperative electronic alliances in education, community service, and economic development.

Created in 1992 in Nashville, Tennessee, Project DIANE was in active operation as a centrally managed public service network until 2006. Portions of the network still remain in service, however, though no longer under the Project DIANE moniker.

Peak network membership consisted of more than 200 participating organizations and more than 350 program and technical coordinators, supporting live interactive video programming over a service region consisting of twelve U.S. states and five countries.

== History ==
Project DIANE was first proposed by Dr. Stephen P. Shao, Jr. in 1992 as a regional diversity development project collaboration between the U.S. Tennessee Valley Authority (TVA) and a small consortium of public and private universities located within TVA's six state service region. At the time, Dr. Shao was employed as a business research center director at Tennessee State University in Nashville, Tennessee. After a year of deliberations and two successful community based field pilots, Project DIANE was given startup funding by the TVA.

The two field pilots, named the Nashville Pilot and the City Share Pilot were instrumental in demonstrating that videoconferencing technology was a viable and highly flexible mechanism through which to deliver a broad array of educational, economic development and public service resources to the general public. Both pilots were carried out with the participation of several dozen community service organizations, governmental agencies and corporations.

Primary sponsors and underwriters of the two pilots included TVA, BellSouth, IBM led by Steven Wilkinson, and PictureTel (later purchased by Polycom). The Nashville Pilot was an intracity test of desktop videoconferencing technology with application test sites in Nashville, Tennessee constructed at Tennessee State University, Cumberland Science Museum (later renamed the Adventure Science Center) and the Looby Public Library.

One month after conclusion of the Nashville Pilot, the City Share Pilot testbed was created by connecting the three Nashville video test locations to additional video sites constructed in Huntsville, Alabama. A large portfolio of community oriented and educational test applications between Nashville and Huntsville were launched with a 40-minute discussion of intercity cooperation between the mayors of the cities. It is believed that the City Share pilot was the first ever intercity videoconference link ever constructed for non-commercial purposes.

In the years following the project's pilot startup, many public and private organizations participated in the network's public service programming and donated both in-kind and financial resources. Network participants and supporters were also successful in securing a wide bevy of public and private grants to pay for different types of community applications which utilized the project.

== Overview ==
=== Project objectives ===
Project DIANE's primary objectives were to:

1. develop a successful electronic community service network that could be expanded and/or replicated by all interested members of the community,
2. bring education institutions, business development agencies, and community service organizations closer together for cooperative sharing of scarce public and private resources and
3. provide needy individuals and groups with free, or low cost, digital access to useful information, assistance and professional expertise.

There were two notable aspects about the network. First, the project was designed as a broad-based, rather than niche-focused, community telecollaboration. DIANE membership reflected a wide spectrum of community organizations which came together online to jointly plan and carry out public programs and services.

The project was represented by most segments of the community, both in an organizational context (e.g., schools, community centers, libraries, business agencies, etc.) and individually (child through senior adult, families, disabled, urban and rural, etc.) DIANE was inherently a "project of projects" with teleconferencing applications in the three target areas of education, community service and economic development.

A second key aspect of this project was that, from its inception, DIANE members worked diligently to include disadvantaged or neglected members of society in consortium program development activities. The avoidance of a two-tier cyber-society of "haves" vs. "have-nots" was a high priority. DIANE members took special care to include low income inner city residents, developmentally disabled children, senior citizens, speech and hearing impaired individuals, and other potential information highway have-nots in program development activities.

=== Participants ===
Online members of the consortium included family and community centers, speech & hearing treatment centers, K-12 schools, zoos, museums, public libraries, universities, language institutes, skill training centers, chambers of commerce, economic development agencies, healthcare groups, overseas military bases & dependents schools, and other service organizations.

Specific notable members of the project included the Small Business Administration sponsored Small Business Development Centers, the Tennessee Foreign Language Institute, the Adventure Science Center, Vanderbilt University, the Tennessee Foreign Language Institute, Tennessee League for the Deaf & Hard of Hearing, the Nashville Zoo, the Metropolitan Action Commission, Urban League of Nashville, the Boys & Girls Club, the Girl Scouts of Middle Tennessee, the Catholic Diocese of Nashville, the Tennessee State Library & Archives, the Elephant Sanctuary of Hohenwald, the Nashville Public Library System, the Bank of America Small Business Resource Centers, and the U.S. Department of Defense Overseas Dependents School System.

=== Real-time telecollaboration ===
Telecollaboration was inherently the method by which DIANE organizations educated and assisted one another. Real-time telecollaboration took place in all project activities through two-way electronic exchanges between a resource provider (such as a K-12 teacher, college professor, business counselor, social worker, therapist, or other expert professional) and a person in need (e.g., student, small/minority business entrepreneur, researcher, family member, disabled person, senior citizen, etc.). Real-time multimedia information exchanges occurred during videoconferences via electronic whiteboards, remote application sharing, electronic messaging, hi-speed file transfer and other means.

== Programs and applications ==
DIANE's program portfolio included various independent and inter-dependent telecollaborations, offering resources and assistance to both mainstream and disadvantaged community segments. In addition to the general program descriptions given in this section, interested parties were able to click to the Project DIANE Directory and read the "DIANE Program & Resource Profile" for each individual organization. General teleconference based program areas established by the project included: the Economic Development Partnership, Tennessee Child Development Partnership, Teachers' Teleconferencing Curriculum Forum, Internet Distance Training, Global Community Project, and others.

Examples of specific program activities within these general program areas included the following: The Tennessee League for the Hearing Impaired offered videoconferencing-based Deaf culture workshops, sign language instruction, and translation services. Looby Metro Public Library supported a distance mentorship program called "Adopt-a-Grandparent" in which senior citizen library volunteers provide guidance and counseling to disadvantaged youth who called in from DIANE's community center locations. Therapists and physicians at the Bill Wilkerson Speech & Hearing Center and the Vanderbilt Child Development Center electronically assisted disabled children, including adolescents with autism and related communication disorders. High school students and teachers regularly consulted online with the project's educational resources such as the Cumberland Science Museum (e.g., for science information, environmental workshops, etc.) and to Meharry Medical College (e.g., to learn about viruses), etc.

=== Electronic field trips ===
The use of videoconferencing technology to electronically and interactively take students to exotic and faraway places was pioneered by Project DIANE. An important supplement to in-class instruction, schoolchildren frequently were able to go on electronic field trips through the DIANE network for meaningful interactive real-world learning experiences.

The Nashville Zoo conducted videoconferences with area schools to bring students safe interactive experiences with rare snow leopards and other wild animals. Animal conservationists from the Elephant Sanctuary in Lewis County, TN provided teleconference-based seminars on elephants and the need for animal preservation, even connecting video callers to remote cameras located in the elephant grazing pasture. Radnor Lake State Natural Area offered students a wide range of teleconference activities involving environmental conservation, water ecology, and wireless video/underwater camera views of its wildlife residents.

Often, Project DIANE electronic field trips took the children to international locations such as France, England, Japan, or to meet interesting people such as jet pilots, film actors and corporate executives. The Tennessee Foreign Language Institute conducted world culture seminars and foreign language instruction to DIANE participants, also providing students remote playback access to its 250+ international tape library. Tennessee's state information repository, the Tennessee State Library & Archives, provided interactive teleconference-based history seminars, library reference assistance, and live curator based video access to its rare manuscript collection, includes original American Civil War photographs, historic architectural drawings, original letters of President Andrew Jackson, the 1796 Tennessee State Constitution, etc.

=== Connecting students to experts outside the classroom ===
Connected schools and community centers teleconferenced with the local public library for story telling hour and puppet shows, with NationsBank's Small Business Resource Center and the Nashville Area Chamber for youth career planning and entrepreneurship programs, and with Meharry Medical College for health and hygiene workshops. An advanced placement (AP) course shared curriculum was being developed for use by area high schools. Current AP course development included environmental science and biology.

Regarding business development programs, any area business with compatible technologies could access Project DIANE's online economic development member agencies, including SBRC business experts, SBRC library resources, SBDC business counselors, area chamber of commerce program personnel, university business faculty, etc.

=== Awards and recognitions ===
International recognitions of Project DIANE included: Polycom Corporation's Exceptional Content Provider Award (8/03), a Top 5 Rating by the European Commission's Global Bangemann Challenge (Stockholm, 6/99); 6 NII Global Information Infrastructure award citations (12/96-2/98) including an AT&T Special Telecollaboration Award; a "national success story" citation by the President's National Information Advisory Council (2/96), and an Awards Laureate designation by the Smithsonian Institution Information Technology Awards Program (6/95).

Key invited presentations and demonstrations of Project DIANE programming include national conferences and forums hosted by the American Library Association (Atlanta, GA, 6/02), National Science Foundation (Berkeley, CA, 12/00), U.S. Dept of Commerce (Washington DC, 4/98) and the White House (Philadelphia PA, 4/97).

== Technology evolution ==
Project DIANE began as an all Integrated Services Digital Network (ISDN) BRA based community network using desktop personal computers deploying an H.320 codec, which later evolved into a hybrid switched digital and Internet IP based H.320/H.324 platform. The videoconferencing equipment used by Project DIANE in the Nashville and City Share startup field pilots were all OS/2 based videoconference units (PCS/1s) provided through a joint development partnership at the time between PictureTel and the IBM Corporation. These early video units were replaced during the startup phase with Windows OS-based PC desktop units.

In later years, the project's infrastructure also included a large number of set top videoconference units, as well as several dozen videoconferencing units for conference rooms. In the late 1990s, a large corporate donation of more than a hundred new videoconference units more than doubled the size of DIANE to more than two hundred video locations.

Project DIANE also later acquired a Tandberg Multipoint Control Unit (MCU), sometimes referred to as a video bridge or gateway, which allowed the network to deliver its interactive programming to up to 16 separate locations simultaneously. Funding for the MCU's required network connections (a Primary Rate Access high speed digital telephone line and an IP broadband access line) was provided by Tennessee State University and the Tennessee Department of Human Services, Rehabilitation Services Division.

== See also ==
- History of virtual learning environments
- Videotelephony
