= Teleseminars =

Teleseminars are used to provide information, training, or promote or sell products to group of people interested in a particular topic. They are similar to traditional seminars, in content and purpose, but they are given over a teleconference or bridgeline rather than at a specific location.

It is an emerging way to communicate, provide teletraining, and conduct business without the cost of travel. The host of the teleseminar will schedule a specific time and date in advance to communicate with his/her audience. The audience can vary in size from a few callers to 1,000 participants depending on the capacity of the bridgeline used and the popularity of the topic being discussed.

== History ==
The first generation of teleseminars can be traced from 1990, when there were only three types of teleseminars were available audio, video and audiographs.

== Usage ==
Teleseminars provide an opportunity for a host to provide information to a large number of people at one time. It allows a trainer to train many participants at once, one on many rather than one on one. These conference calls are typically recorded. There's typically a fixed period of time devoted to the presentation of information followed by another fixed period of time for questions and answers.

=== Cost ===
It also eliminates the need for travel, expensive preparation, and presentation material costs. These factors make teleseminars a very cost effective delivery method.

Teleseminars can be free or have a cost associated with participation for the students. The cost will vary depending on the content being discussed and the organization hosting the call. Despite the participation fee, the advantage for students is this medium does not require the hassle and expense of traveling to a live seminar. Participants can join the teleconference from home or anywhere there is a telephone connection.

After paying the fee, participants will receive a phone number and passcode for the call. If there is no charge for the teleseminar, the phone number and passcode may be distributed via email or may be available on the company's website.

=== Style ===
Teleseminars are primarily of three types, interview style, lecture style, and interactive style. The usage of teleseminar depends upon the agenda of information to be shared.

=== Telesummit ===
Hosts may conduct many teleseminars on a specific topic over a period of a few days or weeks in a format that's come to be known as a "telesummit". A Telesummit is a series of teleseminars held over the course of multiple days with multiple experts talking about a specific topic, generally in an interview format. The term was first coined in 2005 by Milana Leshinsky, who conducted the first telesummit, Coaching Tele-Summit 2005, modeled after a live conference and included training sessions, small group discussions, and live online chat.

Today, telesummits have evolved into virtual summits, which incorporate online live streaming video, pre-recorded video sessions, webinars, and social media to engage and interact with the audience. A common form of telesummit allows participants to listen in for free, but pay for recordings and/or transcripts of the calls.
