= Press conference =

Media event attended by journalists

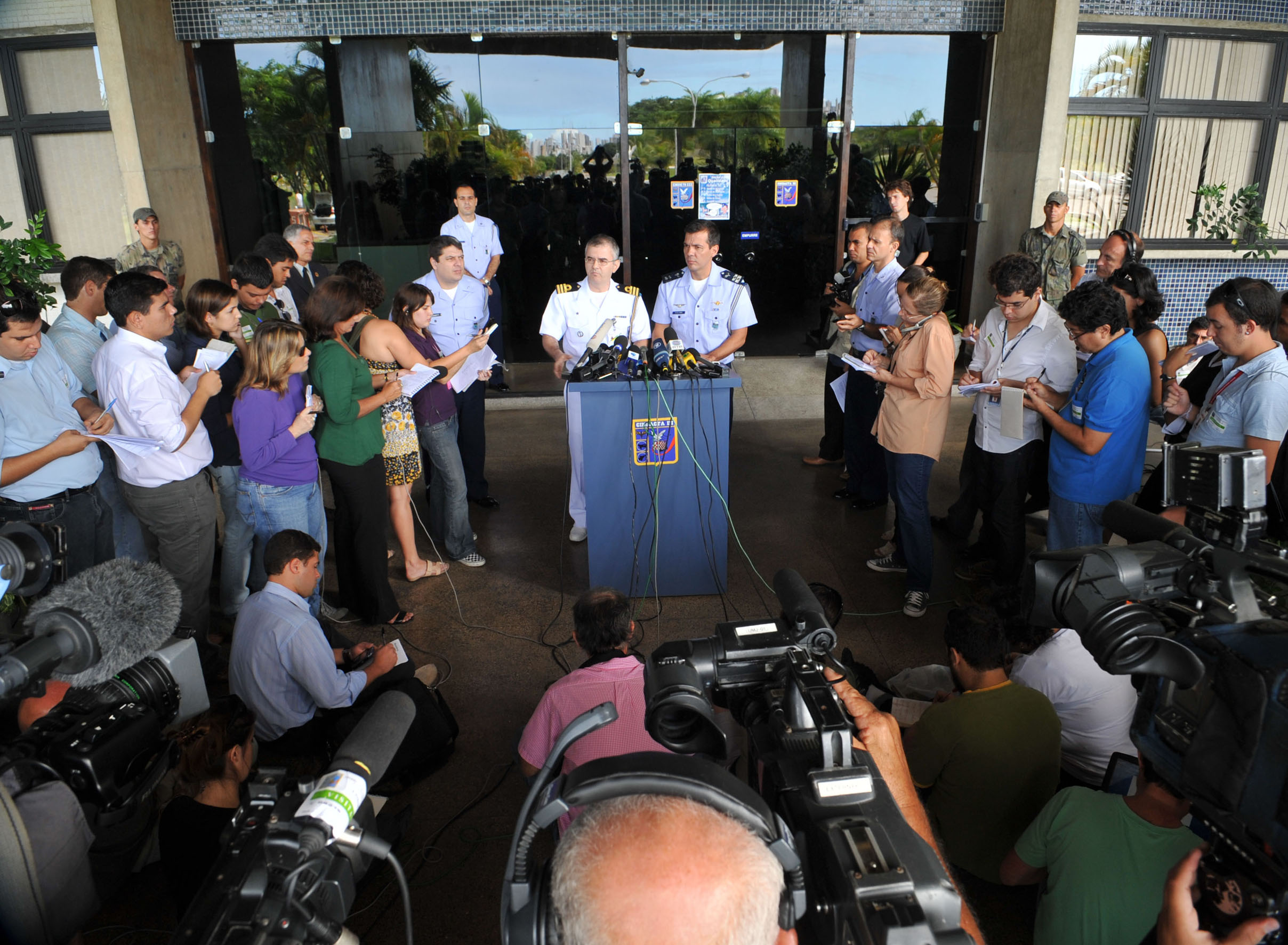
Press conference discussing Air France Flight 447

A press conference or press meet, also called news conference or press briefing, is a media event in which notable individuals or organizations invite journalists to hear them speak and ask questions. Press conferences are often held by politicians, corporations, non-governmental organizations, and organizers for newsworthy events.

== Practice ==
In a press conference, one or more speakers may make a statement, which may be followed by questions from reporters. Sometimes only questioning occurs; sometimes there is a statement with no questions permitted.

A media event at which no statements are made, and no questions allowed, is called a photo op. A government may wish to open their proceedings for the media to witness events, such as the passing of a piece of legislation from the government in parliament to the senate, via a media availability.

An example of a press conference held by political activists

News conferences are often held by politicians; by sports teams; by celebrities or film studios; by commercial organizations to promote products; by attorneys to promote lawsuits; and by almost anyone who finds benefit in the free publicity afforded by media coverage. Some people, including many police chiefs, hold press conferences reluctantly in order to avoid dealing with reporters individually.

A press conference is often announced by sending an advisory or news release to assignment editors, preferably well in advance. Sometimes they are held spontaneously when several reporters gather around a newsmaker.

News conferences can be held just about anywhere, in settings as formal as the White House room set aside for the purpose or as informal as the street in front of a crime scene. Hotel conference rooms and courthouses are often used for press conferences. Sometimes such gatherings are recorded for press use and later released on an interview disc.

== Media day ==
Media day is a special press conference event where rather than holding a conference after an event to field questions about the event that has recently transpired, a conference is held for the sole purpose of making newsmakers available to the media for general questions and photographs often before an event or series of events (such as an athletic season) occur. In athletics, teams and leagues host media days prior to the season and may host them prior to special events during the season like all-star games and championship games.

== See also ==
- Media scrum
- Press videoconferencing
- Pseudo-event
- Message discipline
- Press release
- Press service
- Fact sheet
- Grassroots
- Public relations
- Science by press conference

== Photos ==
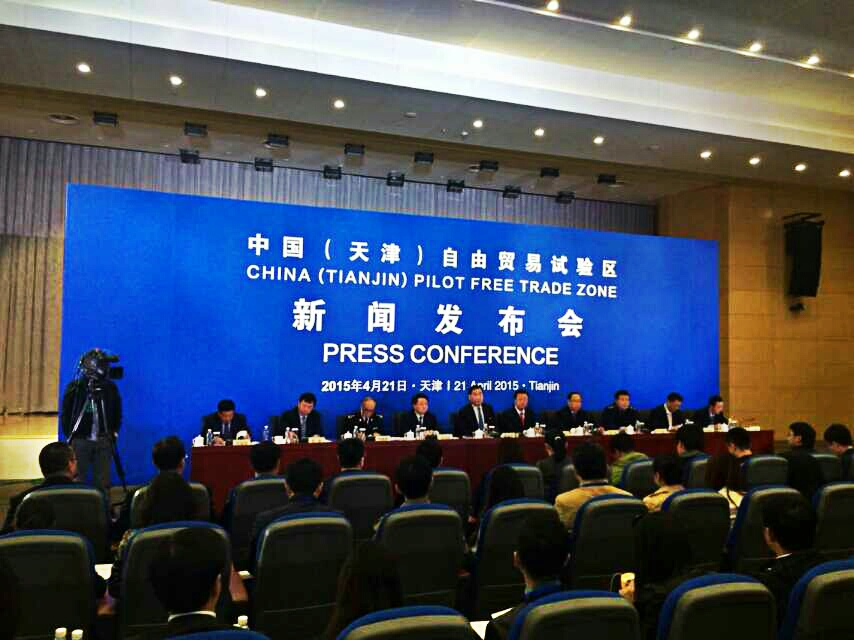
A press conference of the Tianjin Free-Trade Zone

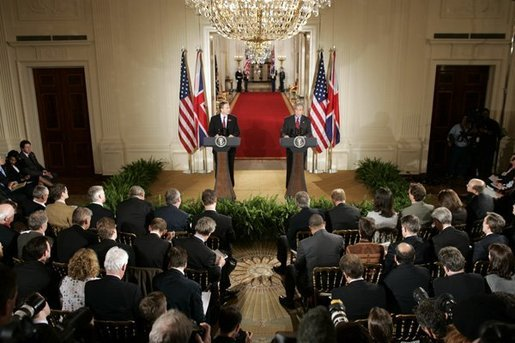
A joint press conference by United States President George W. Bush and British Prime Minister Tony Blair at the White House (12 November 2004)

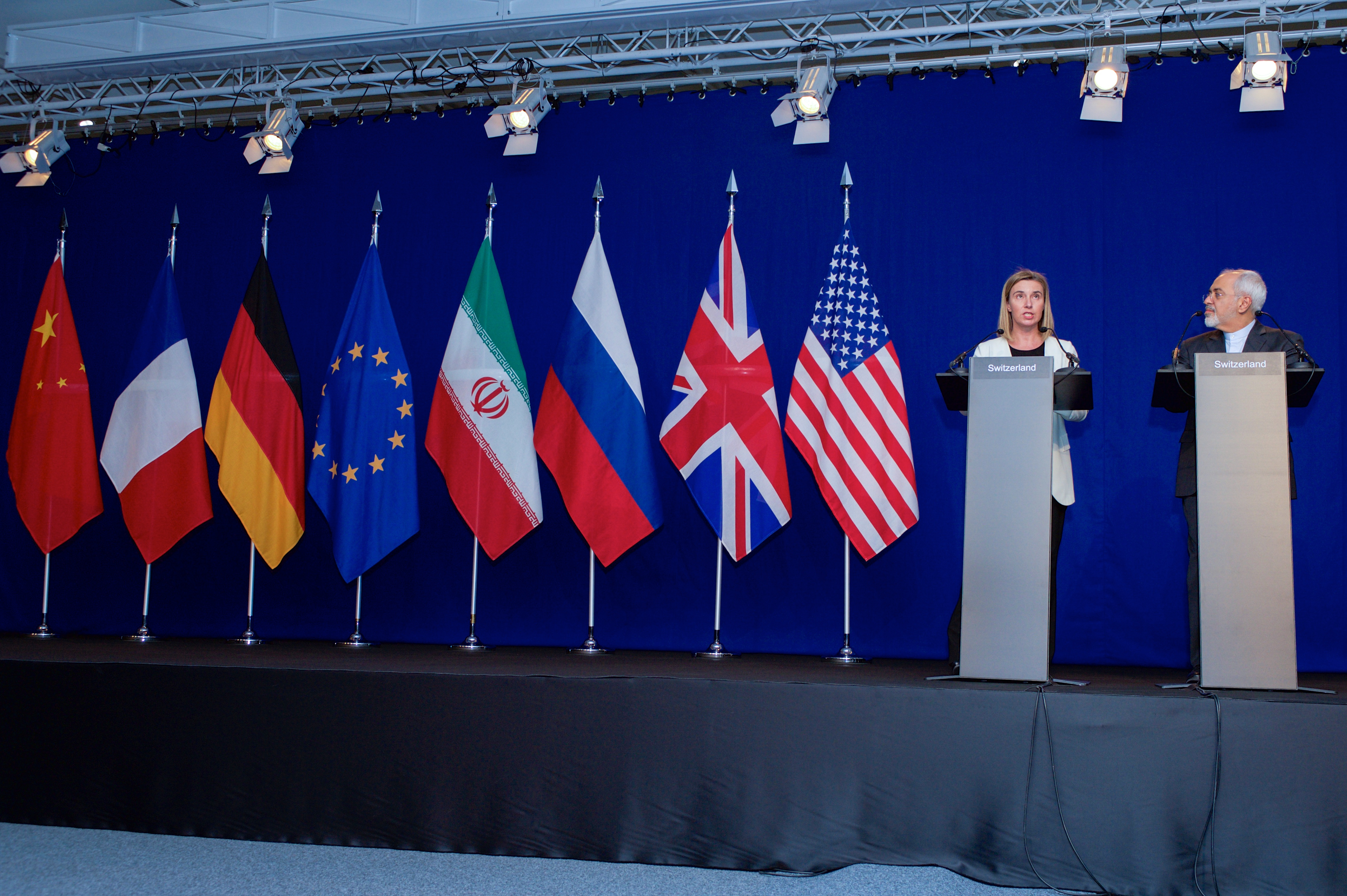
The press conference of the High Representative of the European Union for Foreign Affairs and the Minister of Foreign Affairs of Iran following the multilateral negotiations on Iran nuclear deal framework in Lausanne (2 April 2015)

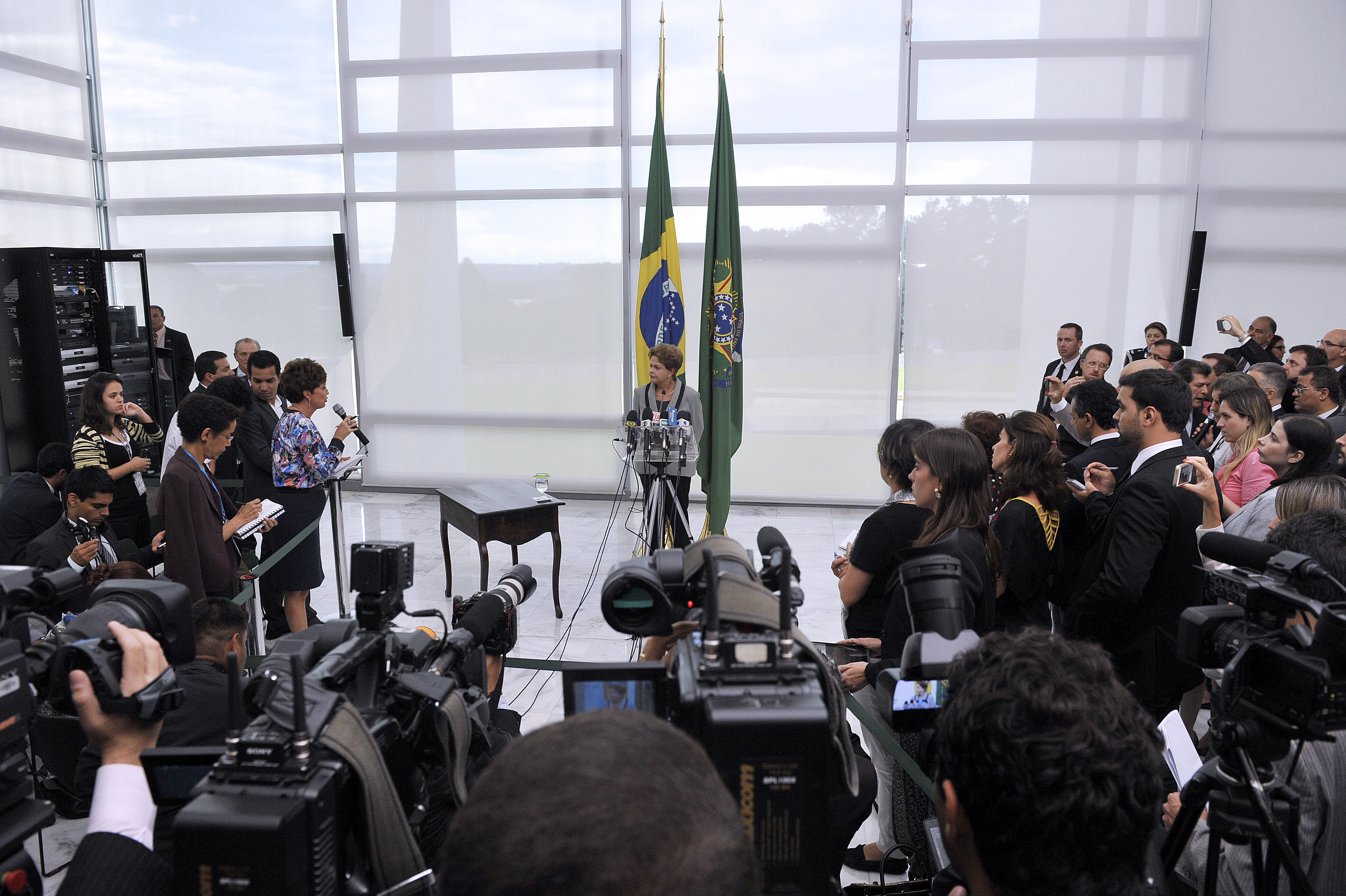
Brazilian President Dilma Rousseff holds a press conference at the Palácio do Planalto (16 March 2015).

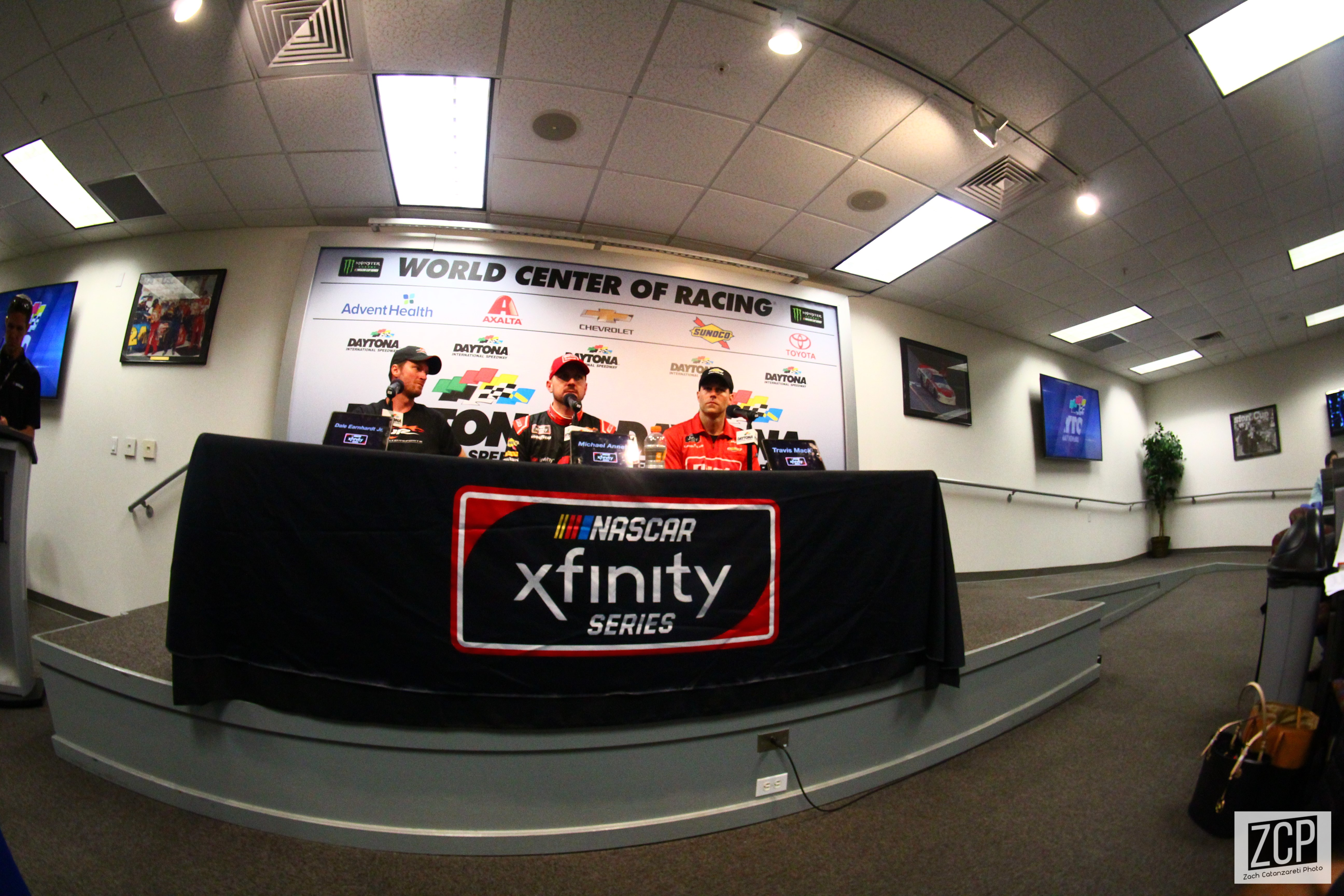
Michael Annett of NASCAR Xfinity Series in the media day at Daytona International Speedway

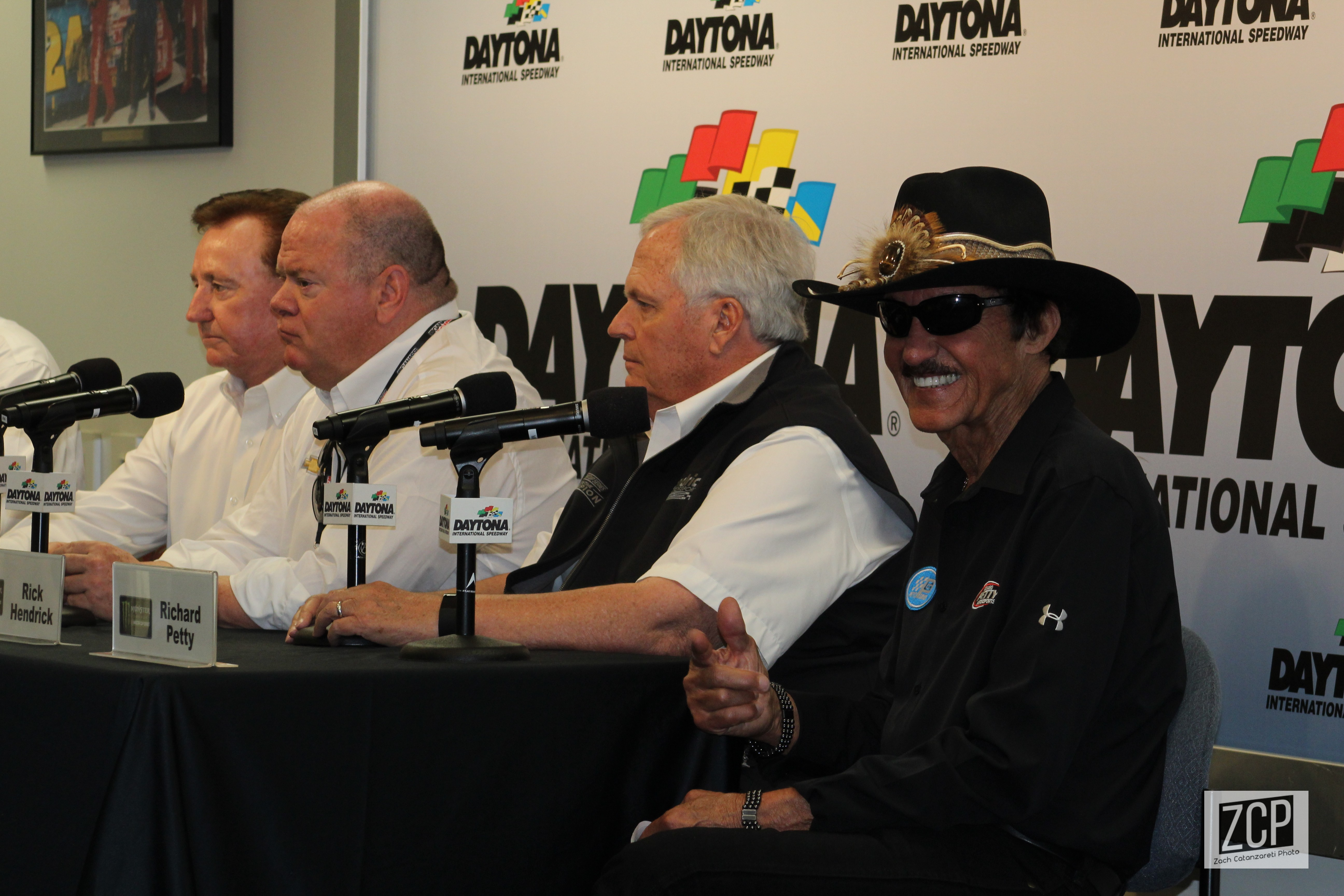
Monster Energy NASCAR Cup Series team owners (from left-to-right, Richard Childress, Chip Ganassi, Rick Hendrick, and Richard Petty) during media day at Daytona International Speedway
