= Teleconference =

Live exchange of information among several persons remote from one another

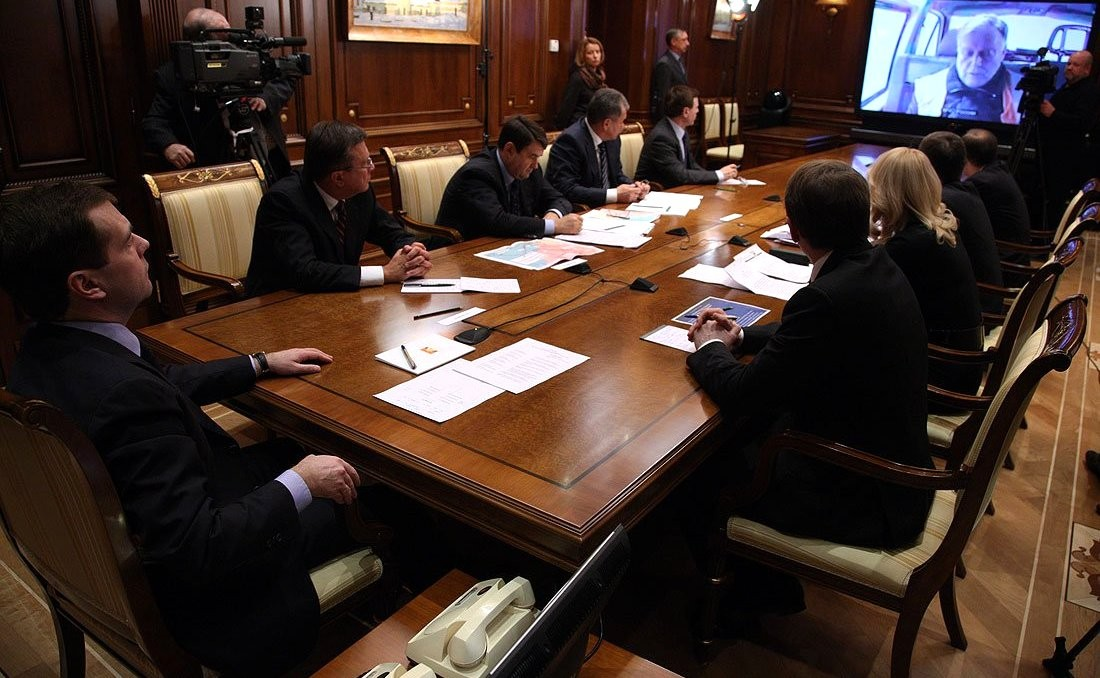
Russian president Dmitry Medvedev held a teleconference with Russian Railways president Vladimir Yakunin on the consequences of the 2009 Nevsky Express bombing.

A teleconference, also known as a telecon, is a real-time exchange of information among multiple participants who are geographically separated but connected through a communications system. Terms such as audio conferencing, telephone conferencing, and phone conferencing are also sometimes used to refer to teleconferencing.

The communications system may support the teleconference by providing one or more of the following: audio, video, and/or data services by one or more means, such as telephone, computer, telegraph, teletypewriter, radio, and television.

== Internet teleconferencing ==
Internet teleconferencing includes internet telephone conferencing, videotelephony, web conferencing, virtual workplace, and augmented reality conferencing.

Internet telephony involves conducting a teleconference over the Internet or a wide area network. One key technology in this area is Voice over Internet Protocol (VOIP).

A working example of an augmented reality conferencing was demonstrated at the Salone di Mobile in Milano by AR+RFID Lab.

== See also ==
- List of video telecommunication services and product brands
- Media space – Electronic settings where people can work while not present at the same place and time
- Telepresence – Technologies allowing a person to feel they are present in another place
- Teleseminar
- Virtual exchange
