= List of video telecommunication services and product brands =

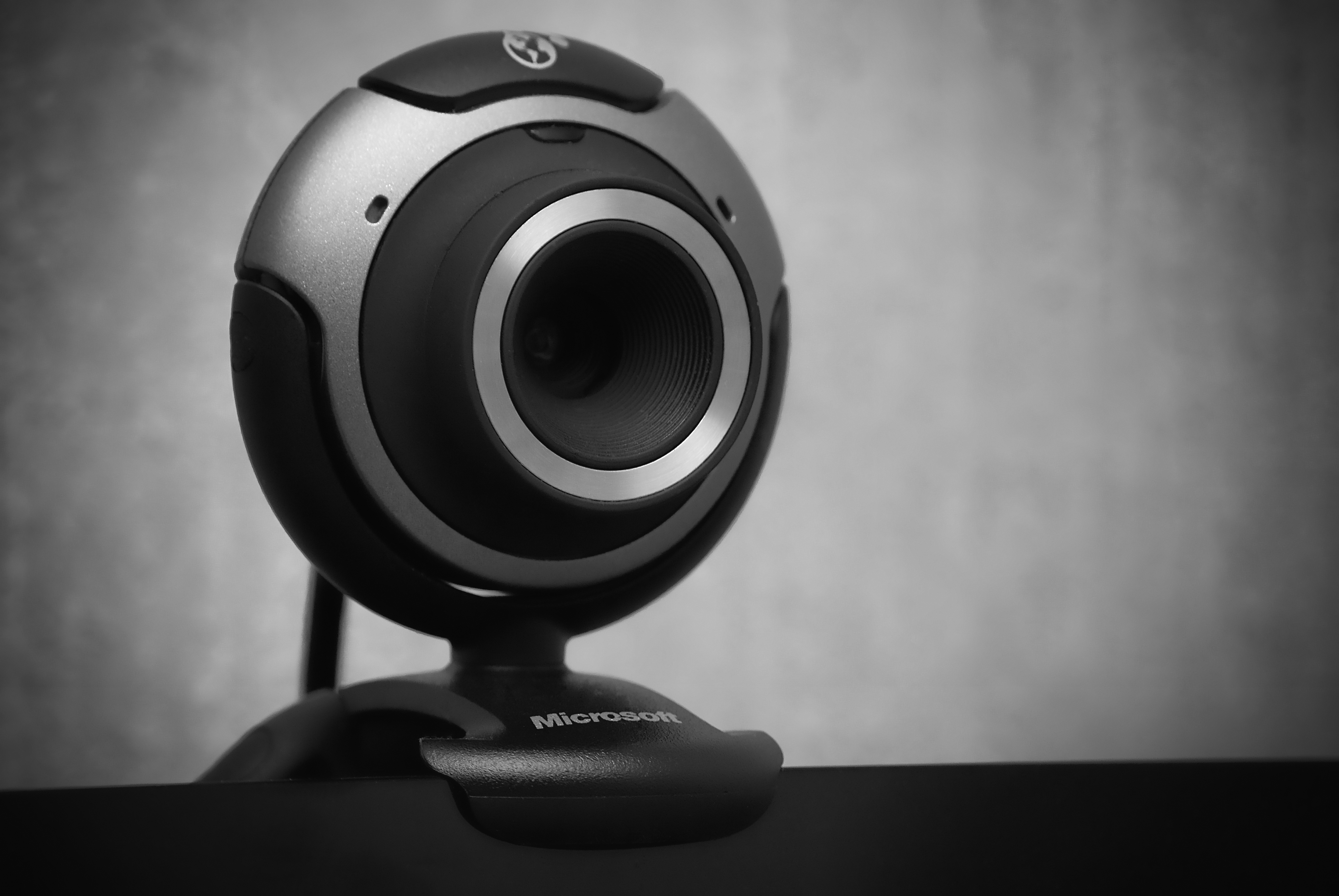
A typical low-cost webcam (a Microsoft LifeCam VX-3000) for use with many popular video-telecommunication programs (2009)

This list of video telecommunication services and product brands is for groupings of notable video telecommunication services, brands of videophones, webcams and video conferencing hardware and systems, all related to videotelephony for two-way communications with live video and audio.

- The first section includes video telecommunication devices such as videophones, videoconferencing and telepresence systems, webcams and related products such as codecs and videoconferencing software clients;
- the second section is a listing of video telecommunication services such as Video Relay Services (for deaf, hard-of-hearing and speech-impaired individuals), telemedicine, Public Access Videoconferencing facilities, etc.
- the last section at the bottom of this page lists defunct brands and services for historical research purposes.

The products below are listed by their normal and intended purpose, even though their names or descriptions may differ from the categories shown here (refer to terminology within general article pages).

== Hardware, software and related product brands ==
=== Videophone hardware brands for person-to-person (point-to-point) use ===
Stand-alone videophones are point-to-point units not employing Multipoint Control Units (centralized distribution and call management systems). Earlier models make video calls utilizing older analogue POTS telephone lines, while later models use newer, higher quality, ADSL, ISDN or cable broadband technologies. Some videophones also employ Internet calling (IP) capabilities which can dispense with the need for telephone service.

- ACN: IRIS (United States)
- Avaya: Scopia videoconferencing systems
- AVer Information: HVC130 (Taiwan)
- D-Link: DVC series (Taiwan)
- Ericsson-LG: LVP series PSTN, ISDN and IP videophones (South Korea)
- Huawei: TEx0 series, VP9000 series
- Leadtek: IP broadband videophone (Taiwan)
- LifeSize: LifeSize Passport Connect, LifeSize Passport & LifeSize Express (United States)
- Polycom: VVX1500, VVX600 and VVX500 Business media phones (United States)

=== Videoconferencing and telepresence hardware systems meant for multiple participants ===
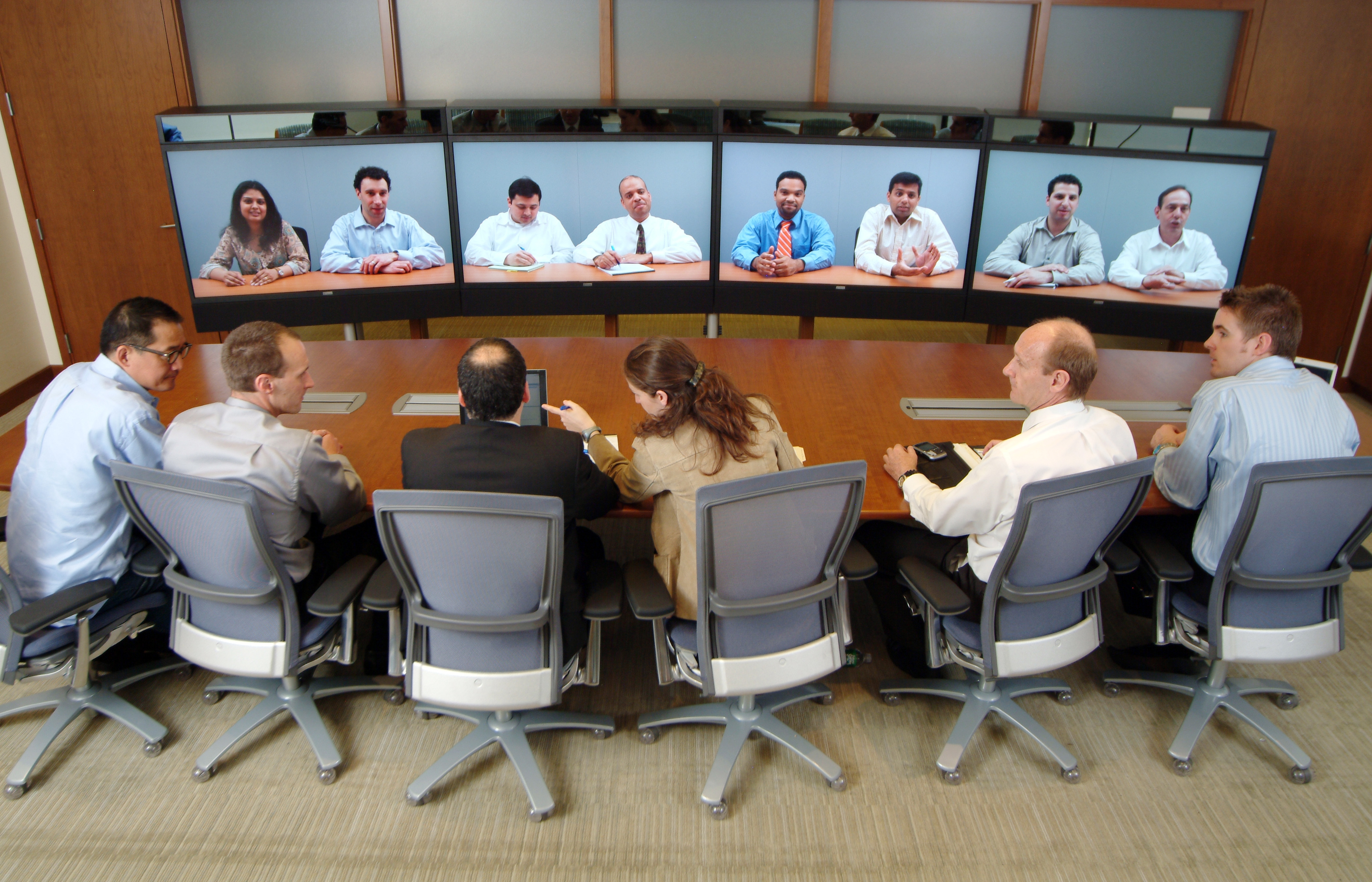
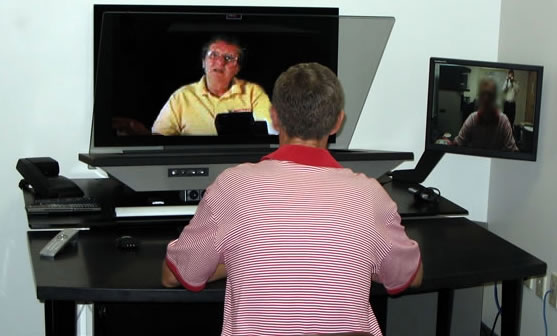
A high resolution telepresence system and a developer in Colorado, U.S. using telepresence to coach a teacher in Utah during research for Project thereNow.

Video conferencing systems allow multiple participants by use of a Multipoint Control Unit (a centralized distribution and call management system) or via a similar non-centralized multipoint capability technology embedded in each unit. Some multiple party systems utilize Web-based bridging service providers, which can incur slight time delays.

- Avaya: (Radvision) Scopia systems (United States)
- AVer Information: EVC, SVC (Taiwan)
- Cisco Systems: Cisco TelePresence inc. Cisco SX, MX and Spark Room systems (United States)
- GoTo Meeting: Online meeting software (Global)
- Highfive: Highfive & Dolby Voice (United States)
- Huawei: TP Telepresence series
- Ericsson-LG: LVP series PSTN, ISDN and IP videophones (South Korea)
- Facebook Portal
- Librestream: Onsight (Canada)
- LifeSize: LifeSize Icon, Lifesize Team, Lifesize Express, LifeSize Room & LifeSize Conference (United States)
- Panasonic: VC500 (Japan)
- Polycom: RealPresence Immersive Studio, OTX, HDX, RealPresence Group series (United States)
- Polycom: VVX (United States)
- Sony: PCS systems (Japan)
- StarLeaf: Huddle, GT Mini 3330 and GT 3351 (UK)
- Vidyo: VidyoRoom & VidyoDesktop (United States)
- Zoom: Zoom Rooms and Zoom Conference Room Connectors (United States)
- Hopin

Some cameras have a 360-degree video image, so that all participants on one location can be recorded with one camera.

=== Videoconferencing hardware systems meant for the deaf, hard-of-hearing, telemedical and other institutional services ===
- Librestream: Onsight (Canada)
- Mirial s.u.r.l.: PSE Video Contact Center, comprehensive solution for remote audio and video contact services
- Polycom: Practitioner Cart, HDX Immersive Telemedicine Education systems

=== Videoconference bridging service providers ===
- ACT Conferencing: (APAC, EMEA, NA)
- BT Conferencing: (NA, APAC, EMEA)
- CoroWare Inc.: CoroCall HD Video Conferencing Service (United States)

=== Webcam hardware brands for use on personal computers ===
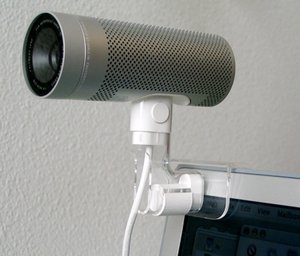
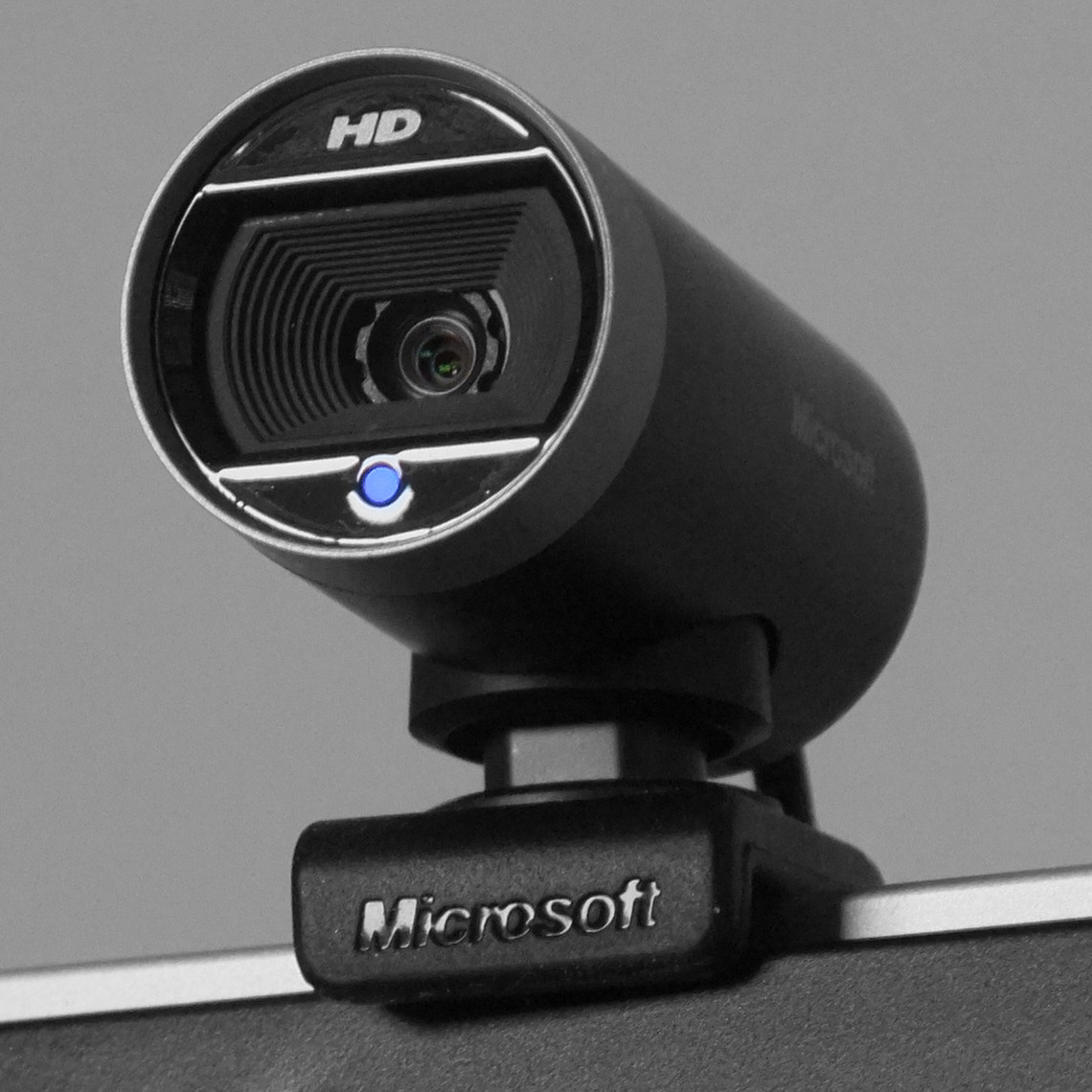
A pre-2006 Apple iSight webcam, with software drivers written specifically for Apple's operating systems and a 2009 LifeCam Cinema USB video device for use with standard drivers.
- Apple: iSight series/components (United States)
- Creative: Live! Cam series (Singapore)
- FaceVsion: TouchCam (Taiwan)
- Hama CM Series, plus other various models (Germany)
- Hercules: Dualpix (France)
- Labtec: Labtec WebCam Series (United States)
- Lenovo: Webcam (People's Republic of China)
- Logitech: QuickCam series (Switzerland)
- Linksys by Cisco (United States)
- Microsoft: LifeCam Series (United States)
- Philips: SPC Webcam Series (Netherlands)
- Samsung (South Korea)
- Sony: PlayStation EYE webcamera (Japan)
- Trust: WB Series, plus various other models (Netherlands)

=== Software clients ===
==== With video and VoIP ====
- BlackBerry: BBM Meetings
- Blue Jeans Network: cloud-based videoconferencing service
- Cisco: WebEx
- Cisco: Jabber XCP
- Conference XP
- FaceTime
- Google Duo
- GoTo Connect: Cloud Phone System, CX, Contact Center
- GoTo Meeting: Video conferencing software
- Highfive
- Librestream: Onsight Expert Collaboration Software
- LifeSize: Desktop
- LoopUp
- Microsoft: NetMeeting
- Microsoft: Office Live Meeting
- Microsoft Teams
- Mirial s.u.r.l.: Mirial Softphone
- Nefsis: Nefsis Professional
- Polycom: RealPresence Desktop (for Windows and Mac), RealPresence Mobile (for smartphones and tablets) & CloudAXIS Suite (web browser plug-in)
- Pristine: Mobile video collaboration and support
- Radvision: MTF, VTA & IMS Applications
- SightSpeed
- Scopia
- StarLeaf
- Stickam
- TeamTalk
- TeamViewer
- Thinking Phone Networks
- Tokbox
- Vidyo
- VSee
- vzRoom
- Zarafa (software) WebApp (via WebRTC)

==== With video, VoIP and instant messaging ====
- Adobe Connect
- Alfaview
- Camfrog
- CU-SeeMe
- Discord
- Ekiga
- Google Hangouts
- GoTo Connect Unified VoIP calling, video conferencing, business messaging
- iChat
- Jami
- Jitsi
- Pidgin
- MeBeam
- Microsoft: Windows Live Messenger
- Microsoft: Windows Live Video Messages
- Microsoft Teams
- Movim
- ooVoo
- Paltalk (now PaltalkScene)
- SightSpeed
- Signal
- Skype
- StarLeaf
- Stickam
- Tinychat
- Tox (Protocol implemented in various clients)
- Wire
- Yahoo! Messenger
- Zoom: Zoom Cloud Meetings

=== Browser based – does not require software downloads ===
- BigBlueButton
- Discord
- Galene
- Google Duo
- Google Hangouts
- Google Meet
- JioMeet
- Jitsi
- Microsoft Teams
- Movim
- Skype
- UberConference
- Vidyo

=== Software clients for deaf and hard-of-hearing VRS/VRI facilities ===
- Mirial s.u.r.l.: Mirial Softphone

=== Server software ===
- GNU Gatekeeper
- Mirial s.u.r.l.: ClearSea

== Video telecommunication services ==
=== Video telecommunication services for the deaf and hard-of-hearing ===
- National Association for the Deaf: Video Relay Service (VRS)

=== Medical organizations employing video telecommunications ===
- American Telemedicine Association

=== Public videoconferencing facilities ===
- FedEx Office: formerly FedEx Kinko's. Conference rooms with video conferencing.
- Marriott Hotels: conference rooms with video conferencing.

== Defunct brands and services ==
Brands, manufacturers and other services listed here are no longer in production or no longer exist, and are listed for historical or research purposes.

=== Defunct videophone hardware brands ===
- Tandberg: E20 of Norway, acquired by Cisco in 2009
- Picturephone, world's first commercialized videophone for individual and business use, developed by AT&T and Bell Labs
- Cisco Umi, a home consumer version of their enterprise offerings (see above), briefly marketed in 2010-2011

=== Defunct videoconferencing system hardware brands ===
- HP: Halo Telepresence Solutions (United States), acquired by Polycom in 2011
- IBM Person to Person, a software-only collaborative conferencing system interoperable between OS/2, Windows and AIX developed and marketed between 1991 and 1995.
- Tandberg: T3 Telepresence of Norway, acquired by Cisco in 2009

=== Defunct software brands ===
- Tandberg: Movi, acquired by Cisco in 2009
- AOL Instant Messenger (AIM)
- ooVoo: ooVoo (only for Windows or Mac)

== Videotelephony descriptive names and terminology ==
The name [videophone]is not as standardized as its earlier counterpart, the telephone, resulting in a variety of names and terms being used worldwide, and even within the same region or country. Videophones are also known as videotelephones (or video telephones) and often by an early trademarked name "Picturephone", which was the world's first commercial videophone produced in volume. The compound name "videophone" slowly entered into general use after 1950, although "video telephone" likely entered the lexicon earlier after "video" was coined in 1935.

Videophone calls (also: videocalls and video chat), differ from videoconferencing in that they expect to serve individuals, not groups. However that distinction has become increasingly blurred with technology improvements such as increased bandwidth and sophisticated software clients that can allow for multiple parties on a call. In general everyday usage the term videoconferencing is now frequently used instead of videocall for point-to-point calls between two units. Both videophone calls and videoconferencing are also now commonly referred to as a video link.

Webcams are popular, relatively low cost devices which can provide live video and audio streams via personal computers, and can be used with many software clients for both video calls and videoconferencing.

A videoconference system is generally higher cost than a videophone and deploys greater capabilities. A videoconference (also known as a videoteleconference) allows two or more locations to communicate via live, simultaneous two-way video and audio transmissions. This is often accomplished by the use of a multipoint control unit (a centralized distribution and call management system) or by a similar non-centralized multipoint capability embedded in each videoconferencing unit. Again, technology improvements have circumvented traditional definitions by allowing multiple party videoconferencing via web-based applications. A separate webpage article is devoted to videoconferencing.

A telepresence system is a high-end videoconferencing system and service usually employed by enterprise-level corporate offices. Telepresence conference rooms use state-of-the art room designs, video cameras, displays, sound-systems and processors, coupled with high-to-very-high capacity bandwidth transmissions.

Typical use of the various technologies described above include calling or conferencing on a one-on-one, one-to-many or many-to-many basis for personal, business, educational, deaf Video Relay Service and tele-medical, diagnostic and rehabilitative use or services. New services utilizing videocalling and videoconferencing, such as teachers and psychologists conducting online sessions, personal videocalls to inmates incarcerated in penitentiaries, and videoconferencing to resolve airline engineering issues at maintenance facilities, are being created or evolving on an ongoing basis.

== See also ==
- eMedicine
- List of Session Initiation Protocol (SIP) software
- Mobile collaboration
- Telepresence
- Unified communications, the integration of non real-time communication services such as unified messaging (integrated voicemail, e-mail, SMS and fax) with real-time communication services such as instant messaging, etc.
- Videotelephony, parent article
- Web conferencing, used to conduct live meetings or presentations via the Internet
- Webcam (Internet web cameras)
- Webcast, “broadcasting” over the Internet
