= Mobile collaboration =

Mobile collaboration is a technology-based process of communicating using electronic assets and accompanying software designed for use in remote locations. Newest generation hand-held electronic devices feature video, audio, and telestration (on-screen drawing) capabilities broadcast over secure networks, enabling multi-party conferencing in real time (although real time communication is not a strict requirement of mobile collaboration and may not be applicable or practical in many collaboration scenarios).

Differing from traditional video conferencing, mobile collaboration utilizes Wireless, cellular and broadband technologies enabling effective collaboration independent of location. Where traditional video conferencing has been limited to boardrooms, offices, and lecture theatres, recent technological advancements have extended the capabilities of video conferencing for use with discreet, hand-held mobile devices, permitting true mobile collaborative possibilities.

== Scope ==
The scope of mobile collaboration takes into account a number of elements that continue to evolve in their sophistication and complexity: video, audio and telestration capabilities, conferencing and telepresence systems, collaboration tools, transmission technologies, and mobility.

== Forecasts ==
Cisco Systems predicts "two-thirds of the world's mobile data traffic will be video by 2015." The Unified Communications Interoperability Forum (UCIF), a non-profit alliance of technology vendors states that "one important driver for the growth of UC (unified communications) is mobility and the remote worker. No segment is growing faster than mobile communications, and virtually every smart phone will be equipped with video chat, IM, directory, and other UC features within a few years."

== Impact on industry ==
To date, the use of mobile collaboration technology extends to industries as diverse as manufacturing, energy, healthcare, insurance, government and public safety. Mobile collaboration allows multiple users in multiple locations the ability to combine their input while working towards the resolution of problems or issues in today’s complex work environments. This can be done in real time with advanced video, audio and telestrator capabilities, comparable to working together in the same room but without the associated expense and downtime typically involved in getting the experts to remote locations.

=== Manufacturing ===
Manufacturers of all kinds use mobile collaboration technology in a number of ways. Recent trends in globalization and outsourcing in particular, have meant that companies need to communicate with employees, suppliers, and customers the world over. The flexibility of hand-held mobile collaboration devices allow real-time communication to take place at any location where products are being designed, built, and inspected, such as an automotive assembly plant a continent away. Improved communication through mobile collaboration affects many aspects of complex manufacturing such as production line maintenance, supply chain management and equipment field service.

=== Energy ===
Companies in the energy sector often operate across geographically dispersed locations, including offshore facilities and remote sites where communication infrastructure may be limited. Developments in mobile collaboration technologies and transmission networks have facilitated communication between personnel in these environments and colleagues in other locations. Such technologies are used for activities including remote inspections, safety audits, maintenance, repair and overhaul operations, as well as information technology and communication infrastructure support.

=== Healthcare ===
Although telemedicine technology has been in use for a number of years in the healthcare sector, mobile collaboration technology extends these capabilities to locations now reachable through the use of hand-held devices such as a remote community, long-term care facility, or a patient’s home. Healthcare professionals in multiple locations can together view, discuss, and assess patient issues. The use of mobile collaboration technology within the healthcare sector has the potential to improve the quality and access to care, while making its delivery more cost-effective.

=== Education ===
Mobile collaboration technology can be and is used for remote education. From one on one tutoring to large classes it has many uses. Homeschooling benefits from this technology as people can participate in a lecture from anywhere in the world. Teachers can record their classes or lectures and review them. Internet schools, including higher education, benefit from this development in mobile education. Though these methods are not widely used they are quite useful and most likely will become widely popular.

== Franchise businesses ==
Mobile collaboration between franchiser and franchisee allows modern technology to be used to allow a better flow of communications similar to face-to-face, albeit remotely via video/voice media such as smartphones, tablets, iPhones, iPads, etc. to be collectively used without requiring one party to travel to another location. This in turn reduces travel time and expenses not to mention better and quicker modes of communication.

Franchisers who have several hundred franchisees find it an absolute must.

== Brands of Equipment, Software, and Related Products ==
=== Brands of Videotelephony Equipment for Use in "Person-to-Person" (Point-to-Point) Mode ===
Standalone videophones are point-to-point devices without the use of multipoint control units (centralized call distribution and management systems). Some videophones also support internet calling (IP), which allows bypassing telephone networks. Notable examples:

- ACN: IRIS (USA)
- Avaya: Scopia Videoconferencing Systems
- D-Link: DVC Series (Taiwan)
- Ericsson-LG: LVP PSTN, ISDN, and IP Videophone Series (South Korea)
- Huawei: TEx0 Series, VP9000 Series
- LifeSize: LifeSize Passport Connect, LifeSize Passport, and LifeSize Express (USA)
- Polycom: VVX1500, VVX600, and VVX500 Business Phones (USA)

Hardware Videoconferencing and Telepresence Systems Designed for Multiple Participants Videoconferencing systems allow multiple participants to join a conference using a multipoint control unit (MCU, a centralized call distribution and management system) or similar decentralized multipoint technology built into each device.

- Avaya: (Radvision) Scopia systems (USA)
- Cisco Systems: Cisco TelePresence Inc. Cisco SX, MX, and Spark Room Systems (USA)
- Highfive: Highfive and Dolby Voice (USA)
- Huawei: TP Telepresence Series
- Ericsson-LG: LVP PSTN, ISDN, and IP Videophone Series (South Korea)
- LifeSize: LifeSize Icon, LifeSize Team, LifeSize Express, LifeSize Room, and LifeSize Conference (USA)
- Panasonic: VC500 (Japan)
- Polycom: RealPresence Immersive Studio, OTX, HDX, RealPresence Group Series (USA)
- Sony: PCS Systems (Japan)
- StarLeaf: Huddle, GT Mini 3330, and GT 3351 (United Kingdom)
- Vidyo: VidyoRoom & VidyoDesktop (United States)
- Zoom: Zoom Rooms and Zoom Conference Room Connectors (USA)

== Software Clients ==
There are software clients with video and VoIP capabilities, such as BlackBerry: BBM Meetings, Blue Jeans Network, Cisco, WebEx, and Librestream. Some clients additionally support instant messaging alongside video and VoIP. Among them are:

- Adobe Connect
- Alfaview
- Camfrog
- CU-SeeMe
- Discord
- Ekiga
- Google Hangouts
- iChat
- Jami
- Jitsi
- Pidgin
- MeBeam
- Microsoft: Windows Live Messenger
- Microsoft: Windows Live Video Messages
- Microsoft Teams
- Movim
- Nextiva: NextOS unified communications platform with cloud communication services
- ooVoo
- Paltalk (now PaltalkScene)
- SightSpeed
- Signal
- StarLeaf
- Stickam
- Tinychat
- Tox (Protocol implemented in various clients)
- Wire
- Yahoo! Messenger
- Zoom: Zoom Cloud Meetings

== See also ==
- List of video telecommunication services and product brands
- Virtual collaboration
- Visual networking
