= Librestream =

Librestream Technologies Inc. is a privately owned, venture capital–backed company based in Winnipeg, Canada. Librestream provides technologies that enable mobile and remote enterprise collaboration.

Librestream is known for its hand-held mobile devices and accompanying software which help extend traditional video conferencing and collaborative services to more locations.

== Mobile collaboration ==
Mobile collaboration is a technology-based process of communicating utilizing electronic assets and accompanying software designed for use in remote locations. Newest generation hand-held electronic devices include video, audio, and telestration (on-screen drawing) capabilities broadcast over secure networks, enabling multi-party conferencing in real-time.

Differing from traditional video conferencing, mobile collaboration utilizes Wireless, cellular, and broadband technologies enabling effective collaboration independent of location. Where traditional video conferencing has been limited to boardrooms, offices, and lecture theatres, recent technological advancements have extended the capabilities of video conferencing for use with discreet, hand-held mobile devices, permitting true mobile collaborative possibilities.

== Company history ==
The origins of Librestream date back to the late 1980s in Winnipeg, Canada, when Kerry Thacher co-founded Ubitrex Corporation with Robert Nickel, a small high-tech start-up that designed and developed a clinical information system for use in hospitals to capture patient data. The system included a hand-held device designed for use by clinicians. Subsequent to successful clinical use of this system, Ubitrex was sold in 1994 to U.S.-based Continental Healthcare Systems.

Two years later, Thacher bought back the device side of the business from Continental and formed AirWire Mobile Technologies Inc. which continued to support the substantial base of hospitals using the technology. Only a few weeks into AirWire’s operation, Symbol Technologies Inc., a large U.S.-based manufacturer of mobile devices, took notice of AirWire’s unique expertise and contracted with Airwire to create a product to help Symbol pursue the healthcare market.

In 1999, Symbol bought AirWire. Over the next few years, the team, continuing to operate out of Winnipeg, successfully designed and developed a number of mobile devices, one of which delivered Voice over IP (VoIP), a significant advancement in mobile device technology at that time. This activity led to the development of high-volume hand-held mobile expertise in Winnipeg for the first time, a capability that would later form the foundation for the creation of Librestream.

In August 2003, Thacher left Symbol, and weeks later Symbol closed its Winnipeg office. Although many of the engineers received offers from Symbol to re-locate to New York, all declined. Later in 2003, a group of eight professionals from the former Winnipeg arm of Symbol gathered to plan their next venture. In addition to Thacher, this group included Bill Gillanders, Rob McConnell, Don Freiling, Tim Braun, Kent Wotherspoon, Conway Wieler, and Chris Kavanagh.

Two things were clear: the emergence and continued growth of the Internet was certain, and there existed a tangible opportunity to develop enhanced video-handling capabilities for a next generation of hand-held devices. The group was convinced that together they could design and develop the necessary technology to allow individuals, regardless of location, the ability to collaborate in new ways. The technology would extend the boundaries of traditional videoconferencing beyond the boardroom to workplaces previously unreachable such as a manufacturing plant floor a continent away.

Librestream (a combination of ‘free’ and stream’) was formed in 2003 by Kerry Thacher. Backed by venture capital and individual investors, Librestream developed its first alpha product, the MCD-1000, coupled with desktop collaboration software, MCA, in 2006. Eventually, the mobile collaborative device evolved into the Onsight 1000, one of multiple rugged hand-held devices in the Onsight product line. The desktop collaboration software evolved into the Onsight Expert application.

In 2006, Librestream formed a marketing partnership with Tandberg, one of the leading video conferencing industry players at that time. The arrangement offered Librestream industry exposure and allowed the breadth and depth of the product to grow in response to evolving requirements.

By 2010, Librestream’s customer base grew to include global enterprises, many of them Fortune 500 firms, in industries such as manufacturing, energy, healthcare, insurance, government and public safety.

== Technological advancement ==
The impact of mobile collaboration technology is significant in its potential to change the way people work. Live, visual interaction removes traditional restrictions of distance and time. Business processes are optimized through accelerated problem resolution, reductions in downtimes and travel, improvements in customer service and increased productivity.

== Partnerships ==
Librestream works with three strategic partners. With Cisco Systems, Librestream is a Registered Cisco Developer Network member, and Onsight is a core component of the Cisco Manufacturing Mobile Video Collaboration (MMVC) solution. With Inmarsat, Librestream has successfully tested the Onsight system over the Inmarsat BGAN satellite network to provide mobile collaboration to land and maritime satellite customers. With Verizon Wireless, Librestream has tested and optimized the Onsight mobile devices for 4G LTE networks.

== See also ==
- Telepresence
- Telemedicine
- Unified communications
- Video conferencing
- Videotelephony
- Virtual collaboration
- List of unified communications companies
- List of video telecommunication services and product brands
