= VSee =

Secure, no-code, low-code telehealth platform

VSee Lab, Inc
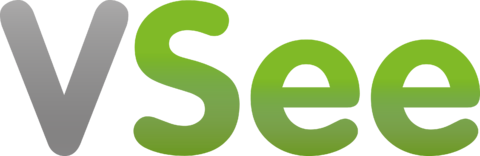
- Company type: Private
- Website type: Videoconferencing
- Headquarters: Sunnyvale, California
- Founders: Milton Chen and Erika Chuang
- Key people: Milton Chen, CEO; William Perry, Board of Directors; James Gibbons, Board of Directors; Terry Winograd, Board of Advisors; Pat Hanrahan Board of Advisors; David Kelley, Board of Advisors; James Davis, Board of Advisors
- Website: www.vsee.com

VSee is a secure, no-code, low-code telehealth platform. It provides customizable omni-channel communications, virtual care workflows, remote team coordination tools and apps for operating and delivering healthcare services from a distance. This includes product features such as a complete online medical office suite, digital front door mobile app, provider dispatch automation, telehealth billing services, remote patient monitoring, and other functionalities to deliver virtual care.

It began as a proprietary low-bandwidth, group video chat and screen-sharing software tool. It came out of a Stanford University PhD project addressing the problem of making virtual teamwork easy and conveying trust over video.

The video feature allows multiple users in various locations to communicate in real-time by video and audio. Its interface is able to concurrently display video faces and allow users annotate on shared screen content. VSee sends video at rates as low as 50 kbit/s and is capable of real-time video communication over 3G cellular networks.

VSee is based in Sunnyvale, California with remote staff located worldwide. In April 2022, VSee had over 120 employees.

== Origins and notable dates ==
VSee Lab, LLC was founded by Drs. Milton Chen and Erika Chuang. The original VSee prototype came out of Dr. Chen's doctoral studies at Stanford University where he focused his work on video communication and the psychology of teamwork. His thesis "Conveying Conversational Cues Through Video". addresses both the psychological and technical aspects of video communications. VSee became a C corporation in 2008.

- In 2008, VSee Lab, Inc. was incorporated.
- In 2008, VSee also received investment funding from In-Q-Tel and an award grant from the National Science Foundation (NSF) Small Business Innovation Research (SBIR) Program.
- In 2010, Salesforce invested in VSee.
- In 2011, VSee pushed out its Mac client.
- In 2012, VSee released secure instant messaging. It was also approved by US Congress for use behind their firewall.

== Corporate history ==
In June 2024, VSee Lab merged with iDoc Telehealth, a provider of tele-intensivist and ICU care services, and combined with a special-purpose acquisition company, Digital Health Acquisition Corp, to form a publicly traded company, VSee Health, Inc. (Nasdaq: VSEE). Following the merger, the company expanded its offerings to include teleradiology and inpatient/ICU telehealth services, securing contracts with clients including Premier, Inc. and NASA, and continuing government work through the U.S. Department of Health and Human Services. VSee Health reported revenue of approximately $14.6 million for the 2025 fiscal year, a 40% increase over 2024.

In May 2026, VSee Health sold VSee Lab, Inc. back to co-founder and former co-CEO Milton Chen under a stock purchase agreement, returning VSee Lab to private ownership and separating it from the publicly traded parent company.

VSee Board of Directors include former Defense Secretary William Perry, former Stanford University Dean of Engineering James Gibbons, and Jingle Video for RTP co-author Milton Chen. Its Board of Advisors include Terry Winograd, Pat Hanrahan, David Kelley, and James Davis.

According to the company, its customers include IBM, Shell, Kaiser Permanente, NASA, the Navy SEALs, and US Congress, and its users include well-knowns such as Angelina Jolie, Mandy Moore, and Linkin Park.

Investors include In-Q-Tel and Salesforce.com.

== Features and design ==
VSee sends and receives high quality video over consumer-grade networks using software. VSee uses a managed peer-to-peer architecture similar to Skype. However, a server is used for address lookup and for administrative purposes. Data being sent and received among clients does not pass through the server. This data is encrypted using FIPS 140-2. VSee also uses a proprietary network-sensing algorithm that adapts to network conditions, allowing it to deliver video over very low-bandwidths and with minimal impact to a network. VSee supports the following features:

- group video chat up to 15–20 people
- screen-sharing with annotation
- file sharing
- group and private chat (during video chat)
- stand-alone instant messaging
- auxiliary camera support
- remote camera control

== See also ==
- ooVoo
- Google Hangouts
- Collaborative software
- Web conferencing
- List of collaborative software
- List of video telecommunication services and product brands
