= Soapbox (disambiguation) =

A soapbox is a raised platform from which a speech is delivered.

Soapbox may also refer to:

- Soapbox (car), a type of motorless vehicle
- MSN Soapbox, an Internet video service
- Soapbox (the Crookes album), released in 2014
- Soapbox, a channel of the Maffick web platform
