= Averkey =

An Averkey (AVerkey) is a device that was built by the AVerMedia Group. The device allows a user to simultaneously display their computer on a TV. Main components in this device are zoom, pan, and picture positioning. Cables used for this device are VGA in (from PC) and VGA out (to PC monitor) and S-Video (or RCA Composite video cable) out (to TV).

AVerkey devices are often used in school districts to display information to the classroom from a PC. Such information can be a DVD, Discovery United Streaming, and other video or multi-media.

Averkey was registered as a trademark in 1997. The trademark expired in 2021.
