= Dreaming in Mono =

McDonald's advertising campaign in the Nordic countries

- Agency: Perfect Fools Fredrik Heghammar, managing director Tony Högqvist, founding partner, Global Creative
- Client: McDonald's; Shaun Russell, Senior Marketing Director Nordic
- Language: English, Danish, Norwegian, Swedish
- Running time: 7 episodes x 8 minutes
- Release date(s): January 2010
- Directed by: Jens Jonson
- Music by: Martin Landqvist
- Starring: Bernard Cauchard Jari Hinshelwood Ole Vevle Marie Bergman Andreas Holm-Hansen Linnea Lundmark Marica Rosengarden Alexandra Alegren Felipe Morales McOwan Ferenc Horvath
- Production company: Happy Fiction
- Produced by: Lukas Wojarski
- Official website: http://www.dreaminginmono.com

Dreaming in Mono is a transmedia storytelling branded content initiative from McDonald's and Perfect Fools, produced by Happy Fiction, in the four Nordic countries of Denmark, Finland, Norway and Sweden. The story combines three principle themes: the Nordic passion for winter sports; the prejudices, rivalries and stereotypes of the Nordic nations; the role of McDonald's as the largest host of diverse people and fun experiences in the region.

== Story ==
Dreaming in Mono is a fictional drama revolving around McDonald's customer and former professional alpine skier Alain Duchamp and his archrival Hansi Von Spitzmark. The two rivals regularly competed against each other in the 1970s with fundamentally different styles and philosophies concerning their approach to life and to their sport. In one particular race Alain attempted to race against Hansi by using his revolutionary new monoski. Hansi quickly reported Alain to the relevant ski governing body and Alain was disqualified and never raced again. Hansi, meanwhile, won gold after gold medal and became an international celebrity.

Fast-forward to the present day and Alain is based somewhere remote in the northern borderlands of Sweden, Finland and Norway still unable to come to terms with what happened so long ago. He devises a plan to exact his revenge on Hansi and enlists a disparate group of Nordic characters to help him.

== Content ==
Dreaming in Mono combines a 56-minute-long drama (divided into 7x8 minute episodes) with character interviews by the fictional documentary filmmaker Yasmine, history of monoskiing backstories, character songs and videos, website, character Myspace and Facebook pages, character Twitter feeds. The aim of the initiative was to connect via non-traditional and social media with an audience difficult to reach through conventional marketing tactics and messages.

A number of elements were also designed to enable the audience to interact with the content both live and online including: Hansi 'Two Sides of Me' song remix; iPhone 'random menu generator' application, online 'McDate' tool, polls, competitions, 'Mad Mads' milkshake flashmob live events, Facebook Fan pages and the opportunity to comment or start discussions on both the site and social media pages.

== Branding elements ==
The McDonald's name appears in the introduction title to each episode: "McDonald's Nordic Presents". Much of the story then takes place in and around a McDonald's restaurant in the far north. Familiar products such as Chicken McNuggets, Big Mac, juice, coffee and soda are visible in the restaurant scenes.

== Transmedia activation ==
Dreaming in Mono launched in mid-January 2010 with movie-style trailers and ran until the end of February across TV and cinema media, video sites, social media sites, print media and in McDonald's own restaurants within the Nordic region. The 7 episodes were released weekly both online on Vimeo, YouTube and MSN Video and broadcast with exclusive TV station partners either as part of the station's program schedule (Sub Finland) or as full 8 minute commercial 'powerbreaks' (TV3 Puls Denmark, Viasat 4 Norway, TV6 Sweden). Both the character interviews and character webpages were released online in advance of and during the episodal broadcast. The timing of the activation was designed to coincide with the build-up to, and closing weekend of, the Vancouver Winter Olympics in which McDonald's was a global sponsor. What makes it stand out from other branded content initiatives is the way in which brand, agency, director and media outlets worked together to extend that story across a variety of platforms, each accentuating the central idea.

== Awards ==
Dreaming in Mono was awarded with a gold medal in Web at the Golden Award of Montreux. Dreaming in Mono is a Webby Award Honoree in "Integrated Campaigns" and "Websites - Fashion".

== See also ==
- Branded entertainment
