= BlueJeans =

Cloud-based video conferencing service

BlueJeans by Verizon
- Company type: Subsidiary
- Industry: Cloud Video Conferencing
- Founded: 2009; 17 years ago
- Founder: Krish Ramakrishnan; Alagu Periyannan
- Defunct: March 29, 2024
- Headquarters: Santana Row; San Jose; California
- Parent: Verizon Communications
- Website: www.bluejeans.com

BlueJeans by Verizon was a company that provided an interoperable cloud-based video conferencing service. It was headquartered in the Santana Row district of San Jose, California. Prior to being acquired by Verizon in 2020, the company was known as "BlueJeans Network" Verizon decided to close down the Blue Jeans platform in August 2023, and closed the website in March 2024.

== History ==
Krish Ramakrishnan and Alagu Periyannan founded BlueJeans Network in 2009, completing the development within six months of technology trials. Prior to founding the company, Ramakrishnan worked at Accel Partners, and Periyannan was the CTO of Blue Coat Systems as well as a tech lead at Apple Inc. Stu Aaron, the company's chief commercial officer (CCO), described the early work as, "Ultimately, what we're trying to do is make video conferencing as comfortable and as casual as your pair of jeans." The company was able to acquire $23.5 million in venture capital from Accel Partners, NEA, and Norwest Venture Partners, and launched its commercial service on June 29, 2011 with Ramakrishnan as CEO.

The company sought to open up video conferencing to companies across the board, including small businesses and freelancers, in addition to the traditional market of larger corporations. In its first 75 days, BlueJeans grew to 4,000 subscribers from 500 firms. Upon launching, Deutsche Telekom became the company's first major channel partner. The agreement between the firms was to develop "a scalable, interoperable videoconferencing solution in Europe by the end of the year". In 2011 and 2012 it added other channel partners, including InterCall, iVCI, York Telecom, and AVI-SPL. BlueJeans has been used by more than 300,000 people worldwide. In 2013 BlueJeans Network expanded its user base to the UK and Australia. In November 2013, Ari Levy of Businessweek wrote that, "BlueJeans has raised about $100 million in venture funding and estimates it will stream one billion minutes' worth of meetings during 2014, a tenfold increase from this year."

Verizon communications announced on April 16, 2020, that it had entered into an agreement to acquire BlueJeans to expand its Business portfolio offerings, particularly its unified communications offerings. While the price of the acquisition was not announced, it is believed to be in the sub $500M range. The acquisition was completed on May 15, 2020, with the service rebranded as "BlueJeans by Verizon."

On August 8, 2023, Verizon announced that it will shut down BlueJeans in the first half of 2024.

== Video conferencing ==
BlueJeans by Verizon provides a proprietary cloud-based video meetings service, interoperable with software development kit, etc., that connects users across different devices, platforms, and conference programs. Every BlueJeans member has a private “meeting room” in the BlueJeans cloud to schedule and host conference meetings. It operates with business conferencing solutions such as Cisco, Microsoft Lync, StarLeaf, Lifesize, and Polycom as well as consumer services like Google. This service can be used directly through BlueJeans Network or through its partner companies. For example, in 2012 BlueJeans Network began powering the videoconferencing services of InterCall.

CRN described BlueJeans services as "endpoint agnostic", meaning it does not discriminate and can work with any video call software or technology, including smartphones. This allows it to bridge between non-room-based videoconference services as well, regardless of the device or service used.

Michal Lev-Ram of Fortune wrote that, "the company is mostly an enhancement—not a threat—to existing videoconference equipment makers. And whichever company ends up leading the charge, there's no question that interoperability is an inevitable must in videoconferencing, just like it was in text messaging on mobile phones. The more use corporate customers can get out of their videoconferencing systems, the more they'll invest in buying them." In contrast to this, Ari Levy reported in 2013 that BlueJeans Network and similar services had begun to cut into the revenues of larger, room-based hardware system developers, due to their greater flexibility and accessing the market of smaller businesses. That year BlueJeans Network also partnered with Salesforce.com, providing BlueJeans run video conferencing to all Salesforce clients through its "Chatter" tool. Forbes also wrote that BlueJeans "will also enable the sharing of presentations, documents, and video clips in real-time" for Salesforce customers. Other customers for BlueJeans Network include Facebook, Foursquare, and MIT.

== Awards and recognition ==
In February 2012, Frost & Sullivan awarded its Entrepreneurial Company of the Year Award to BlueJeans. The Wall Street Journal named BlueJeans a runner-up in the Software category of its 2012 Innovation Awards. In September 2012, the Telecom Council awarded BlueJeans the Graham Bell Award for Best Communication Solutions in its annual SPIFFY awards. In November 2012, University Business honored BlueJeans with its 1st Annual Readers' Choice Awards in the category of Video Conferencing Services. CRN named BlueJeans one of the 25 Coolest Emerging Vendors for 2012. Gartner also named BlueJeans to its Cool Vendors Report for 2012.

In 2013 CRN repositioned BlueJeans on its list to number six among its ten top start-ups. In 2013 CIO magazine ranked BlueJeans No. 3 among the top ten cloud startups of that year, and Business Insider ranked it among its top 21 cloud startups.
