= ACT Conferencing =

ACT Conferencing, a PGi Company
- Industry: Conferencing / Communications
- Founded: Atlanta, Georgia, U.S.
- Headquarters: U.S.
- Area served: Worldwide
- Key people: Boland T. Jones, Founder, Chairman and CEO
- Services: Audio Conferencing, Web Conferencing, Video Conferencing, Video Event Services
- Website: PGi.com

ACT Conferencing, a PGi Company provides global conferencing services: audio, video, web and multimedia events. The company employs approximately 350 people, who are located in the headquarters office near Denver, Colorado, US; in Lynnfield, Massachusetts, US; and in other offices in Canada, United Kingdom, France, Germany, Netherlands, Hong Kong, Malaysia, Singapore and Australia. ACT Conferencing also operates as ACT Teleconferencing. According to Hoover's Online, the company targets clients in a broad range of industries, including finance, health care, investor relations, legal, government, manufacturing, and technology.

== History ==
Founded in Lakewood, Colorado, US, in 1989, ACT received funding in 2005 from Dolphin Direct, a New York–based private equity fund.

Encyclopedia.com notes that ACT acquired Proximity, Inc., one of the world's largest providers of room-based videoconferencing services, in early 2002.

On September 4, 2013, ACT was acquired by Atlanta, Georgia-based PGi, a global leader in collaboration and virtual meetings.

== Services ==
Conferencing services range from on-demand, self-service to customized global multimedia events. Local dialing is available for participants in more than 65 countries.

ACT utilizes a number of regional carriers including AT&T, Rogers Telecom, Verizon, COLT Telecom, AAPT, PCCW and SingTel.
