= LoopUp =

LoopUp Group
- Formerly: Ring2
- Type: Private
- Industry: Cloud communications; Telecommunications; Unified communications
- Founded: 2003; 23 years ago
- Founders: Steve Flavell; Michael Hughes
- Headquarters: London, United Kingdom
- Key people: Steve Flavell (co-CEO); Michael Hughes (co-CEO)
- Products: Cloud Telephony for Microsoft Teams (Operator Connect, DRaaS, BYoC, SIP Trunking, Contact Centre); Legacy LoopUp Meetings; Managed Events
- Brands: LoopUp
- Website: https://loopup.com

LoopUp is a global provider of cloud-based business telephony services. Its core product is a managed cloud telephony service for Microsoft Teams, sold to multinational enterprises as an alternative to contracting separately with multiple regional carriers; LoopUp delivers Teams calling through Microsoft’s Operator Connect programme, through Direct Routing as a Service (DRaaS), and through Bring Your Own Carrier (BYoC) arrangements.

The company was founded in 2003 in London and San Francisco by Steve Flavell and Michael Hughes, originally as Ring2, to provide enterprise audio conferencing and remote-meeting software. Following its August 2016 flotation on London’s Alternative Investment Market (AIM), reported at the time as the first UK technology IPO after the Brexit referendum - LoopUp expanded through the 2018 reverse takeover of conferencing company MeetingZone. In July 2020 the company launched a global cloud-voice service for Microsoft Teams, which became its strategic focus from 2023, when it exited the Hybridium (mashme.io) hybrid-events business it had acquired in 2021. LoopUp delisted from AIM on 11 April 2024 and became a private company, closing a £12 million private-equity funding round that November.

== History ==
=== Founding and early development (2003-2007) ===
Steve Flavell and Michael Hughes met as British students on the MBA programme at Stanford Graduate School of Business and founded the company as Ring2 in 2003, with offices in London and San Francisco. Early funding came from around 60 angel investors and from the Spanish venture-capital firm Adara Venture Partners. Ring2’s original product was a remote-meetings and audio-conferencing service aimed at professional-services firms, combining one-click joining and screen sharing with audio carried over managed tier-1 telecoms networks. In 2007 the company raised a further funding round to expand its sales team, and in September 2007 it extended its mobile call-control features from BlackBerry devices to Windows Mobile.

=== Growth and rebrand to LoopUp (2007-2016) ===
In December 2010 Ring2 was selected by BT to provide white-labelled conferencing services to BT’s customers under the "BT MeetMe" brand. The company renamed itself LoopUp in 2012 and broadened its service to include remote meetings alongside audio conferencing. In March 2013 LoopUp signed a distribution agreement with Caribbean telecoms operator LIME covering 14 countries, and in September 2015 it opened a New York office to serve the city’s concentration of professional-services firms.

=== IPO and MeetingZone acquisition (2016-2020) ===
LoopUp Group PLC listed on AIM on 24 August 2016 at a valuation of around £40 million, reported by multiple outlets as the first UK technology flotation since the Brexit referendum. Lady Barbara Judge became chair of the board following the listing. Later that year, co-founder Michael Hughes was appointed MBE in the New Year Honours for services to British graduates in Silicon Valley, in part for his role in founding LoopUp and the Silicon Valley Internship Programme. Full-year 2016 revenue rose 39% to £12.8 million.

In May 2018 LoopUp opened an office in Sydney to enter the Australian market, and in June 2018 it acquired UK conferencing company MeetingZone in a reverse takeover valued at around £61 million, more than doubling the size of the group. Group revenue peaked at £52.2 million in 2020, with average headcount rising 40% to 269 employees that year.

=== Pandemic and pivot to Microsoft Teams cloud telephony (2020-2022) ===
Demand for LoopUp’s remote-meetings service rose sharply in early 2020 as enterprises shifted to remote working during the COVID-19 pandemic. In July 2020 the company added a global cloud-voice service for Microsoft Teams, using Direct Routing to connect Teams to LoopUp’s international voice network: the start of what became, over the following three years, a full pivot to Cloud Telephony as the company’s core product. In October 2021 LoopUp acquired SyncRTC, the Spanish parent of hybrid-collaboration platform mashme.io, for an enterprise value of around US$4.5 million (about £3.26 million). Independent trade coverage of the deal described SyncRTC as "a specialist in remote education and corporate training"; LoopUp rebranded the acquired business internally as "Hybridium" and folded it into its collaboration and managed-events division, with SyncRTC founder Victor Sanchez becoming LoopUp’s chief technology officer.

=== Strategic refocus and AIM delisting (2023-2024) ===
In September 2023 LoopUp announced it would exit the Hybridium (mashme.io) business globally, placing the Spanish subsidiary into the Spanish "Concurso" administration process, in order to concentrate resources on its faster-growing Cloud Telephony business; the move was reported to save around €1 million a year in cash costs and remove roughly €1 million of debt from the balance sheet. Cloud Telephony revenue grew 133% in 2023 to £2.8 million, with the business reporting triple-digit growth in customers, contracts and bookings and a sales pipeline of more than £100 million in potential annual recurring revenue.

On 11 March 2024 the board proposed cancelling LoopUp’s AIM listing and re-registering the company as a private limited company, citing the cost of maintaining public-company status relative to LoopUp’s market capitalisation and the need to fund continued investment in Cloud Telephony. Shareholders approved the proposal; the last day of dealings in LoopUp shares on AIM was 10 April 2024, and cancellation of the listing took effect on 11 April 2024.

=== Recent developments (2024-present) ===
On 4 November 2024 LoopUp announced the closing of £12 million in equity funding from existing shareholders and new investors, including venture-capital firms 4Founders Capital and FJ Labs and US investment group BTS Group, alongside a reduced debt facility with Bank of Ireland. In September 2025 global, world-leading sportswear group PUMA selected LoopUp to accelerate its global move to cloud telephony. The collaboration replaces legacy systems with a fully integrated Microsoft Teams solution, paving the way for a consistent, scalable, and cost-effective voice platform across PUMA's worldwide operations. Independent trade press reported the rollout as completed in Chile, Mexico and Argentina before being extended to Australia and New Zealand, with further Asia-Pacific deployments planned. Also in 2025, LoopUp and Swiss software company Luware announced a partnership combining LoopUp’s Teams telephony with Luware’s Nimbus contact-centre platform for enterprise customer-service deployments.

In July 2026 LoopUp partnered with Caribbean telecoms operator Digicel to launch what the companies described as the Caribbean region’s first Microsoft-certified Operator Connect service for Teams; under the arrangement, Digicel Business resells LoopUp’s Operator Connect telephony platform to enterprise customers across the roughly 25 Caribbean, Central American and South American markets in which Digicel operates, with the service becoming available to Digicel Business customers from July 2026.

== Products and services ==
=== Cloud telephony for Microsoft Teams ===
LoopUp’s core business is a managed cloud telephony service for Microsoft Teams, marketed to multinational enterprises seeking a single global provider in place of multiple regional carriers. The company delivers Teams calling and PSTN replacement through three mechanisms: Microsoft’s Operator Connect programme; Direct Routing as a Service (DRaaS), a fully managed direct-routing service for countries outside Operator Connect coverage; and Bring Your Own Carrier (BYoC), which integrates a customer’s existing carrier where required. LoopUp is listed on Microsoft’s AppSource marketplace as a certified Direct Routing provider for Teams. LoopUp added Microsoft Teams contact-centre capability in 2025 through its partnership with Luware.

All services are managed centrally through LoopUp's global management portal.

=== Legacy remote meetings and events ===
LoopUp’s original product line: audio conferencing and remote meetings, sold under the LoopUp brand and, from 2018, also under the MeetingZone brand - continues to be offered to professional-services clients but has been de-emphasized since the company’s pivot to Cloud Telephony. The Hybridium hybrid-events offering, acquired via SyncRTC in 2021, was discontinued in 2023.

== Operations ==
LoopUp is headquartered in London, with additional offices reported in San Francisco, Canada, Barbados, South Africa, Spain, Norway, Switzerland, Ireland, Germany, Sweden, Estonia, India, Singapore, Japan, Hong Kong, Malaysia, and Australia. The company has operated on a distributed, largely remote-work basis; with around 200 employees in 2023, down from a 2019 peak of 269 amid the wind-down of the legacy meetings business.

LoopUp is listed on Microsoft's AppSource marketplace as a certified Direct Routing provider for Microsoft Teams. LoopUp is a Microsoft Solutions Partner for Modern Work with an Advanced Specialization in Calling for Microsoft Teams, and an Operator Connect operator. In 2025 LoopUp partnered with Luware to add Microsoft Teams contact-centre capability to its telephony service.

== Recognition ==
- 2016: co-founder Michael Hughes appointed MBE in the New Year Honours for services to British graduates in Silicon Valley.
- 2025: Gold Globee Business Award, Telecom Cloud Solutions category.
- 2026: "Cloud Solution Infrastructure of the Year," Tech Ascension Awards.
- 2026: named to trade publication The Fast Mode’s "Vendors to Watch" list.

== See also ==
- Cloud communications
- SIP trunking
- Voice over IP

== External link ==
Official LoopUp website
