= Virtual collaboration =

Method of collaboration

Virtual collaboration is the method of collaboration between virtual team members that is carried out via technology-mediated communication. Virtual collaboration follows the same process as collaboration, but the parties involved in virtual collaboration do not physically interact and communicate exclusively through technological channels. Distributed teams use virtual collaboration to simulate the information transfer present in face-to-face meetings, communicating virtually through verbal, visual, written, and digital means.

Virtual collaboration is commonly used by globally distributed business and scientific teams. Ideally, virtual collaboration is most effective when it can simulate face-to-face interaction between team members through the transfer of contextual information, but technological limits in sharing certain types of information prevent virtual collaboration from being as effective as face-to-face interaction.

== Characteristics ==
Sharing of information: Collaboration, by definition, is a process of assembling knowledge from different parties towards a common goal. Virtual collaboration is meant to enable the sharing of knowledge between parties who cannot exchange information due to physical separation. Virtual collaboration platforms allow the transfer of different types of information between collaborators to work towards a common goal.

Dispersed Collaborators: Collaborators within virtual collaboration are physically separated from each other and can only interact virtually. Being able to physically interact with a team member affords many benefits that virtual collaboration cannot provide, and eliminates any need for virtual meetings (sharing of context, interpersonal relationships, etc.). Collaborators can meet physically, but interaction outside of the virtual platform may change the dynamics of the collaboration and classify it as non-virtual.

Technology-mediated: Because virtual collaborators cannot interact physically they use technology to share information over several mediums. Most virtual collaboration platforms are carried out via the internet, for example email, video conferencing, and virtual workspaces. Audio conferencing can also be a means of virtual collaboration, as information is shared over a telephone or other audio device.

== Types ==
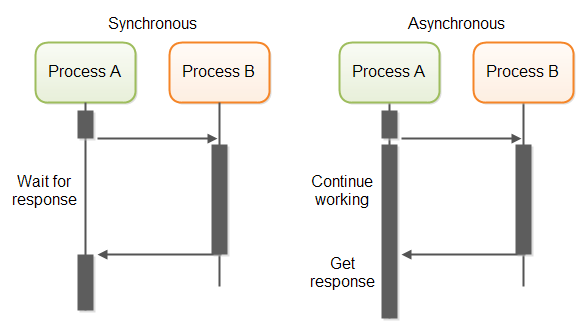
Figure 1. A simple diagram to explain the two modes abstractly. By: Jakob Jenkov

1- Synchronous:Synchronous collaboration occurs when team members are able to share information and ideas instantaneously. Examples of synchronous virtual collaboration include instant messaging, chat rooms, and video or audio conferencing (See figure 1).

2- Asynchronous:Asynchronous collaboration occurs when team members communicate without the ability to instantly respond to messages or ideas. Examples of asynchronous virtual collaboration include e-mail, discussion boards, application-specific groupware, or shared databases (See figure 1).

== Advantages ==
Pooling of expertise: Virtual collaboration provides more opportunities for experts to join project groups where their knowledge can be best used, and be complemented with other experts whose knowledge contributes to a common goal. Virtual collaboration allows teams to be formed based on subject and expertise, without the restriction of physical proximity of collaborators. The pool of expertise is much greater abroad than in most local team settings, meaning that virtual collaboration gives teams an opportunity to add a quality expert that fits the needs of the team. This can be proved by the fact that dispersed teams with recruited experts tend to have higher net earnings than local teams with a local expert.

Cost effective: Compared to face-to-face meetings of distributed group members, virtual collaboration is much less costly. The time and costs associated with transportation to physically bring together team members from different geographic locations can be substantially higher than the cost of a virtual collaborative application. Software used to connect distributed teams can be found for free on the internet, with more feature-loaded and specialized applications having a one-time cost or a paid subscription.

== Disadvantages ==
Lower Group Potency:Virtual collaboration reduces the interaction among the team members, which leads to ineffective discussion and adoption of option that are risker and perhaps less well considered in face to face communication, as said complex task becomes more complex in VC. Moreover due to anonymity of the expert and invisibility of status effect there arises many issues like pressure to conform, lack of appreciation on the performance and can impact the group processes and outcome significantly.

Reduced Cohesiveness:Cohesive groups are generally warm, sociable and personal when it comes to interaction with other members of the group. But with virtual collaboration people tend to have more intragroup conflict than F2F this is due to the exchange of fewer social remarks and less participation.

Poor Satisfaction:As 93% of meaning is contained in facial and vocal cues rather than in text. Therefore technology like virtual collaboration are deprived of facial expression, vocal intonations and indicator of understanding therefore there is a lack of trust and satisfaction among the team members collaborating virtually.

Technological limits: Because technology cannot convey important information, such as context and expressions of emotion, teams are limited in their grounding of knowledge and interpersonal relations. Many of the disadvantages that come with virtual collaboration are the same as those found in virtual groups, due to the fact that virtual groups cannot physically interact with each other. Technology that does not effectively support either collaborators' abilities or the process of the collaboration will result in a "signal loss", or a great reduction in the power of virtual collaboration

Reliance on Technology: Any problems that arise with the technology can obstruct a collaborative effort due to virtual collaboration’s complete reliance on technology for communication. Teams that have do not understand how to use the virtual collaboration technology cannot perform their tasks as efficiently and have higher frustration levels. Malfunctions in the communication technology can also hinder task progress. Also, incompatible or differing technology used between team members may make it more difficult for task to be accomplished.

Asynchronous and lagged communication: Collaborators that are interdependent on each other’s information can experience problems due to the lack of synchronization due to technology. Asynchronous communication does not give team members constant updates in real time, which can lead to coordination and sequencing problems for a task. In video and teleconferencing, time lags due to technology-mediated communication can cause confusion between collaborators. Such coordination problems can frustrate collaborators and result in unnecessary work.

Means of exclusion: The method of information transfer in virtual collaboration can allow for team members to choose who does and does not receive information. For example, an email can be sent from one virtual collaborator to others that they choose, and telephone calls can happen between certain collaborators and not others. This means of exclusion, whether intentional or accidental, can cause confusion and conflict within a group, hindering collaborative processes.

== Challenges ==
Certain challenges are emphasized for utilizing virtual collaboration outcomes. These challenges are: technology-related challenges, cultural diversity-related challenges, and geographic dispersion-related challenges. To overcome these challenges, virtual team should consider knowledge, skills, abilities, and other characteristics (KSAOs) aspects of the members.

=== Technology-related challenges ===
The team needs to have knowledge of both the nature of their work and the virtual collaboration media they choose, and select the best suited media to deal with the most suitable situation. The team also need the skill to deal with the media to overcome issues coming from the media.

=== Cultural diversity-related challenges ===
The team members need to have good knowledge on cultural differences between members and the knowledge of choosing the proper media to smooth these differences. The members are expected to have the skill to adjust their communication behavior and the language proficiency to achieve cultural adaption.

=== Geographic dispersion-related challenges ===
The team member should clearly understand pros and cons of choosing synchronous and asynchronous medias to avoid issues resulted from dispersed workplaces. The skill of time and self-management of team members are also emphasized to overcome this challenge.

=== Trust-related challenges ===
Trust between members of virtual teams affects the quality and amount of shared information. When virtual teams meet face-to-face, it creates trust and cohesion and ensures knowledge sharing. Knowledge sharing in virtual teams influences the formation of trust and contributes to the effectiveness of the team. In written communication one cannot be sure about other members’ commitment and it is difficult to recognize others’ emotions.

=== Time-related challenges ===
If a virtual project is only a small part of the team members' job, members may not have enough time for the virtual project. Thus, for example, they have to process information fast. A particular challenge in virtual teams is following-through and responding at a right time because not responding could be interpreted as a lack of competence or commitment.

Other than these knowledge and skills, it’s crucial for team members to be motivated to face these challenges. Certain experiences and characteristics of team members would also show significant effect.

== Applications ==
Researchers and developers find more and more areas that could benefit from not only traditional media technologies but also emerging media technologies such as Virtual Reality. The first system focused on military, industrial and medical application, but stretched out on commercial use and entertainment soon after.

=== Military Applications ===
Virtual collaboration proves useful in a military setting. The military application supports essential environments including design, assembly, and maintenance, and overcomes a constraint of the geographic distance of many militaries and related enterprises or partners. Thus, virtual collaboration has become indispensable for conducting a daily operation. With the technologies, the integration of fully distributed teamwork enables individuals at different workstations in the same site and those in various places to work together. For instance, military applications augment navigational support, communications enhancement, repair, and maintenance through intrasite and intersite collaborative analyses, as well as allowing the regional expertise developed at each site to be applied wherever necessary across the boundary.

=== Medical Applications ===
Virtual collaboration is used for physician and nurses, or these hospital members and their patients, to be connected even when they are apart so that they can share valuable information. For instance, Web 2.0 applications, particularly wikis, blogs, and podcasts, have been widely used by many online health-related professional. Because it is easy to use and deploy, those tools offer the opportunity for robust information sharing and interaction. One of medical blog examples is the blog, 'Clinical Case and Image.' By sharing related information and technologies written by one person or a group of contributors on the blog, individuals who are interested in constructing knowledge of specific topics on the online community form a virtual grouping together.

=== Entertainment ===
Virtual collaboration such as raid quest or military simulation is widely used in an online multiplayer game. Those tool support users to fight virtual enemies. For instance, recent years have seen the growing use of virtual worlds such as World of Warcraft, a technology-created virtual environment that incorporates representations of real-world elements such as human being, landscapes, and another object. Those virtual worlds can provide the basis for e-collaboration behavior and related outcomes as well as a platform for credible studies of trade the information and tasks.

=== Business and Work-station ===
Virtual collaboration is widely used in corporate businesses for its efficiency, innovation, and ability to gain or keep competitive advantages in the market. Businesses commonly use virtual collaboration technology to facilitate problem solving between teams within the company, and also to collaborate with other companies. Virtual collaboration improves profit margins by increasing operational efficiency and productivity within the company, either by means of innovating solutions or through the increased sharing of knowledge through virtual means. For example, IBM, one of the leaders in using virtual collaboration to promote business processes, has developed many systems to help employees collaborate more easily across boundaries. IBM’s use of virtual collaborative spaces, such as 3-D meeting rooms and use of avatars, in their Virtual Universe Community provides employees with a way to collaborate which has resulted in more production.

=== Education and Training ===
Virtual collaboration is often used to connect experts in a scientific field to others that wish collaborate for researching or educating purposes. Many colleges and learning institutions use virtual systems to host information where both students and experts can share information on a certain subject. Both wikis and virtual conferencing have shown to be effective in sharing expert information to educate students or other individuals interested in the subject. Experts can also virtually collaborate with other experts, across subjects, to discover new things that were not apparent when the collaborators were isolated. Virtual worlds are also now providing platforms for people to collaborate using easily accessible visual analytics. Virtual worlds also provide an arena to observe social science as it pertains to the collaborative efforts of a community.

==== Wikis ====
Wikis are a form of virtual collaboration because they enable people to contribute to an online document that can be seen and edited by other users via the internet. Wikis are considered a Web 2.0 technology, and fall into virtual collaboration due to the collaborative process that documents go through when put into a wiki. Wikis may be described as "open virtual collaboration", which is based on the theories of living systems and includes concepts such as self-organization, chaos theory and emergence. Open virtual collaboration allows persons with a connection to the internet to seek out participation from others in the design and development of new ideas, processes, products, and services for personal and commercial purposes. Information technologies such as tagging and filtering ease the process of finding collaborators online. International Business Machines (IBM) and Procter & Gamble were early commercial beneficiaries of the practice of open virtual collaboration. By accessing the collective intelligence and wisdom of non-affiliated humans connected via the internet companies are able to access knowledge and expertise that might otherwise require significant cost and effort.

== See also ==
- Collaborative engineering
- Computer supported brainstorming
- Computer-supported collaboration
- Collaborative software
- Mobile collaboration
- Telecommunication
- Virtual team
- Virtual volunteering
