= MSN Soapbox =

Soapbox on MSN Video was a service from Microsoft offered via its MSN portal. It was similar to YouTube in that it was an internet video-sharing service. In order to upload content, users were required to sign up for a Windows Live ID, if they did not already have one. The site launched a public beta in February 2007. On June 16, 2009, Microsoft said that they planned to scale back Soapbox, citing tough economic conditions. Uploads to the service ended on July 21, 2009, and in August 2009, the service officially retired.

Soapbox used an interface heavily dependent on JavaScript and AJAX. The original codename for the project was Warhol, the Soapbox name being subsequently chosen by an intern during the summer of 2006. Soapbox on MSN Video differed from other video sites as it offered features such as RSS. Users also did not need to open a new window to continue using the site and browsing videos when they were uploading a video of their own.

The last version of Soapbox was available in American English; service and upload instructions are also in English. There were, however, plans for language availability to be widened in the future. Videos were shown at 400 x 300 pixels by default, but could be expanded to play in full screen. Soapbox played videos using Microsoft's Windows Media Player plug-in when loaded with Internet Explorer, while videos loaded in other browsers were displayed with Adobe Flash Player.

== See also ==
- Windows Live Video Messages
- Bing Videos
- YouTube
