= Windows Live Video Messages =

- Windows Live Video Messages logo.

- Windows Live Video Messages Windows Live Video Messages
- Developer: Microsoft
- Preview release: Beta (Build 2.0.40115.0) / April 28, 2009
- Type: Video instant messaging
- Website: Archived official website at the Wayback Machine (archive index)

Windows Live Video Messages was a Windows Live service by Microsoft. It combined digital video with e-mail into a service that allows all webcam users to create, send, and receive video messages to anyone in their Windows Live Contacts list, even when they are offline. The service also provided a Windows Sidebar gadget for Microsoft LifeCam users that allows them to access their top six contacts and essential Video Messages features directly from their desktop.

Windows Live Video Messages was discontinued on July 21, 2010. The functionalities of Windows Live Video Messages was replaced by the Windows Live Messenger Wave 4 release.

== History ==
Windows Live Video Messages was officially released to public on September 9, 2008. On April 28, 2009, Windows Live Video Messages was updated featuring the new Windows Live "Wave 3" theme and various minor updates and bug fixes. On May 22, 2010, Microsoft announced that Windows Live Video Messages would be discontinued on July 21, 2010. The functionalities of Windows Live Video Messages was replaced by the Windows Live Messenger Wave 4 release.

== Features ==
With Windows Live Video Messages, recipients don't have to download video files onto their computer and play them locally. The service utilizes Microsoft Silverlight 2.0 to stream videos uploaded to and stored on the website by other users. Users are given 4GB of storage space for their video messages and each video message can be up to two minutes.

Users are required to have a Windows Live ID to record, send, manage, or view multiple video messages. However, the viewing of a single video does not require signing into Windows Live ID. Users who have signed into their Windows Live ID account are able to access and view their Windows Live Contacts and directly send video messages to up to 7 recipients. Users are able to control who gets to see their videos by locking or unlocking the messages they had sent. Only unlocked messages can be forwarded or saved by recipients of their video messages. Users are also able to reply to and forward their received video messages, similar to how e-mail functions. The service also supports users to save their video messages directly onto their computer.

If the user is using a Microsoft LifeCam and Windows Vista, they may also use the Microsoft LifeCam Video Messages Sidebar gadget to record, send, forward, and watch video messages directly from their desktop.

== See also ==
- MSN Soapbox
- Windows Live
- Windows Live Messenger
- Windows Live Silverlight Streaming
