= Mirial s.u.r.l. =

- Industry: Electronics
- Defunct: 2011
- Fate: Acquired by Logitech

Mirial s.u.r.l. is a privately held Italian company providing products for visual communication in video/voice over IP, 3G/UMTS, IMS and Unified messaging areas; it engineers and develops appliances and software endpoints for enterprise-grade videoconferencing on converged networks and for IMS PC-to-3G Video Telephony.

On July 20, 2011, Logitech announced acquisition of Mirial.

== See also ==
- Videoconferencing
- IMS
- Professional video over IP
- Voice over IP
- Video Telephony

== Press sources ==
The sources cited below are all articles from the Italian press (newspapers or collaterals and magazines).

- Mirial 4.0 di DyLogic, "La Repubblica - Affari e Finanza", 2004, 21, 24
- DyLogic inaugura due divisioni mirate alle Tlc, "Il Corriere delle Telecomunicazioni - Aziende e Finanza", 2004, 328, 22
- Il client video Mirial (release 3.0) di DyLogic conquista il listino Vcm di pointercom, "Il Corriere delle Telecomunicazioni - Aziende e Finanza", 2004, 315, 21
- Oltre la videoconferenza, il real time è realtà, "Il Mondo", 2004, 1/2, 71
- Videocomunicazione - In arrivo il nuovo Mirial, "Il Corriere delle Telecomunicazioni", 2003, 308, 10
- FASTWEB lancia gli SMS grazie a DyLogic, "Il Corriere delle Telecomunicazioni - Aziende e Finanza", 2003, 304, 24
- VoIP: provider italiani alla riscossa, Week.it, 2003, 25, 14
