= Bing Videos =

Microsoft's Video Search via Bing

- Website type: Search engine
- Owner: Microsoft
- Website: www.bing.com/videos
- Launched: June 1, 2009; 17 years ago

Bing Videos (previously MSN Video and Live Search Video) is a video search service and part of Microsoft's Bing search engine. The service enables users to search and view videos across various websites. Bing Videos was officially released on September 26, 2007, as Live Search Video, and rebranded as Bing Videos on June 1, 2009.

== History ==
The previous incarnation of MSN Video was launched in 2004 as an internet video streaming service created and run by Microsoft, now known as Bing Videos. It featured various content, including music videos, JibJab animated shorts, IFILM picks, viral videos, original content, TV shows such as Arrested Development, and news shorts. It also hosted the semi-finalists for Film Your Issue. Reed Smith, editor in chief of MSN Video and Entertainment, accepted the 2007 Marketer of the Year Award from the Direct Marketing Association on behalf of Microsoft.

MSN Video was known as a user-generated content service in 2007 and 2008. MSN Soapbox was initially an invitation-only beta service under the family of MSN Video products, designed to be a major contributor to the MSN portal. The MSN Soapbox service was discontinued in August 2009. MSN Video was also the name of a former internet television service in the United Kingdom, launched in March 2010.

== Features ==
The Bing Videos home page allow users to browse for TV shows, music videos, the most-watched video content on the Web, and recent news and sports videos.

In addition, while searching for videos, Bing Videos features the following:

- Smart Preview that enables the user to preview a video by mousing over its thumbnail. It allows the user to instantly watch a short preview of the original video
- Filtering that filters results by video duration
- Sorting that sorts results by either relevance or date
- View Selection that switches between the grid view and list view
- Related People that suggests famous people who are related to the query
- Bing Videos is also integrated into other Bing services, including Bing News.

=== Adult content ===
Bing Video's preview mode can potentially be used to preview pornographic videos. By simply turning off safe search, users can search for and view pornographic video by hovering the cursor over a thumbnail, since the video and audio, in some cases, are cached on Microsoft's server.

Since the videos are playing within Bing instead of the site where they are hosted, the videos are not necessarily blocked by parental control filters. Monitoring programs designed to tell parents what sites their children have visited are likely to simply report "Bing.com" instead of the site that actually hosts the video. The same situation can be said about corporate filters, many of which have been fooled by this feature. Users do not need to leave Bing's site to view these videos.

Microsoft responded in a blog post on June 4, 2009, with a short term work-around. By adding "&adlt=strict" to the end of a query, no matter what the settings are for that session it will return results as if safe search were set to strict. The query would look like this: http://www.bing.com/videos/search?q=adulttermgoeshere&adlt=strict (case sensitive).

On June 12, 2009, Microsoft announced two changes regarding Bing's Smart Motion Preview and SafeSearch features. All potentially explicit content will be coming from a separate single domain, explicit.bing.net. Additionally, Bing will also return source URL information in the query string for image and video contents. Both changes allow both home users and corporate users to filter content by domain regardless of what the SafeSearch settings might be.

== See also ==
- Windows Live
