= Camfrog =

Video chat and instant messaging client

- Developer(s): Camshare Inc
- Initial release: October 2003
Stable release
- Android: 7.10.0.8 / March 29, 2021; 4 years ago
- iOS/macOS/iPadOS: 7.16.3 / March 24, 2021; 4 years ago
- Windows: 7.0.9 / July 15, 2021; 4 years ago
- Operating system: iOS, iPadOS, Android, Microsoft Windows
- Available in: 25 languages
- List of languages English, Indonesian, Chinese, Thai, Dutch, French, German, and others
- Type: Online chat
- License: Proprietary
- Website: camfrog.com

Camfrog is a video chat and instant messaging client that was created by Camshare in October 2003. The app allows users to contact others worldwide and find or create chat rooms to gather communities that share similar interests.

== History ==
On October 19, 2010, it was announced that Paltalk acquired Camfrog.

In 2015, A new software called Ribbit was introduced, which allows users to meet others by swiping through live videos.
