= AVI-SPL =

American audio visual service provider

AVI-SPL, Inc.
- Type: Private
- Industry: Software
- Predecessor: Audio Visual Innovations, Inc. (AVI), Signal Perfection, Ltd. (SPL), and Iformata Communications
- Founded: April 17, 2008
- Founders: Martin Schaffel (AVI), Chad Gillenwater, William Parry and Fred Curdts (SPL)
- Headquarters: Tampa, Florida, United States
- Number of locations: 69 offices (2023)
- Area served: Worldwide
- Key people: John Zettel (CEO)
- Services: AV design and integration, remote / onsite managed services, enterprise video
- Revenue: $1.6+ billion (2024)
- Owner: 26North Partners LP
- Number of employees: 4,464 (2024)
- Website: avispl.com

AVI-SPL is an American company that provides multi-office collaboration and audio video technologies as well as managed AV services to businesses and organizations. The company installs equipment related to videoconferencing and telepresence, digital media systems, audio, security systems, control rooms, and provides onsite staffing.

AVI-SPL is headquartered in Tampa, Florida, and as of April 2020, employed 4,300+ people among 69 locations worldwide, including offices in the United States, Canada, United Kingdom, Germany and United Arab Emirates, with a local presence in other EMEA, LATAM and APAC countries.

== History ==
=== Foundations and origins ===
AVI-SPL was formed in 2008 from a merger of Audio Visual Innovations, Inc. (AVI) and Signal Perfection Ltd. (SPL). That merger was facilitated by equity financing from the Silver Lake Sumeru investment division of Silver Lake Partners.

AVI was founded by Martin Schaffel in 1979 in Lakeland, Florida. AVI-SPL began as Audio Visual Innovations in Florida in 1979.

SPL began in Columbia, Maryland. In 1998, the company was acquired by Production Resource Group (PRG). SPL designed, integrated and installed collaborative communication systems for a variety of organizations.

Both companies earned recognition in the 2000s. SPL won a number of awards during this period, including the Best AV Projects Award from ARCHI-TECH magazine from 2004 to 2006. Also in 2006, AVI was named by Systems Contractor News magazine as the top systems integrator in North America, a year during which it had earnings of $216 million. SPL was named the 2005 “Integrator of the Year” by Christie Digital.

AVI and SPL brought 800 and 400 staff, respectively, to the merger, and as a result, became the largest AV integrator in the United States.

=== Growth and acquisitions (2012-23) ===
In January 2012, AVI-SPL acquired Iformata Communications, a video managed services specialist company. AVI-SPL purchased both Iformata's Video Network Operations Center (VNOC) and its VNOC Symphony management platform. Iformata, based in Dayton, Ohio, was founded in 2004.

In September 2016, AVI-SPL founded a new branch office in Germany, AVI-SPL Deutschland GmbH, based in Dreieich in the Frankfurt area. On November 30, 2016, it acquired Anderson Audio Visual, a systems integration company with offices in California, North Carolina, and Texas.

On October 4, 2017, the company acquired Sharp's Audio Visual, with 8 offices in 6 Canadian Provinces. On July 23, 2019, it acquired Digital Video Networks - a top audiovisual (AV) and unified communications (UC) provider in the southwestern United States.

On April 7, 2020, Marlin Equity Partners (Marlin) acquired AVI-SPL and subsequently merged it with Whitlock, an existing Marlin portfolio company.

In December 2021, AVI-SPL acquired SKC Communications, an audio-visual and unified communications provider. In February 2022, it acquired Sonics AVI Ltd., an audio-visual integration firm in Dublin, Ireland.

In January 2023, AVI-SPL acquired AdTech Systems, an audio-visual integration firm operating in New England. Later in January, the company announced the release of a sub-brand AVI-SPL VideoLink, to represent the organisations suite of video services. The brand will focus on enterprise video services. In December 2023, AVI-SPL completed the incorporation of AVI-SPL Japan Private Limited.

=== 26North Partners LP (2025 - Present) ===
On June 25, 2025, 26North Partners LP announced a plan to acquire AVI-SPL.On August 13, the company announced that it had completed this transaction.

== Products and services ==
AVI-SPL provides audio visual technology for video calls and digital workplace collaboration to support work from anywhere. AVI-SPL supports staff working in the office and at home.

AVI-SPL also provides audio visual technology to help companies create immersive experiences.

== Recognition ==
- 2022: the company's Middle East unit won the LAVNCH [CODE] 2022 Out of This World award for Museum of the Future.
- 2022: won the Strategic Account Management Association (SAMA) 2022 Inaugural Systemic Enablement of the SAM Program award and the 2022 Outstanding Mature Program of the Year.
- 2023: the company was recognized as the top systems integrator by Systems Contractor News.
- 2023: it won Cisco 2023 Reimagine Workspaces Partner of the Year - Americas.
- 2024: AVI-SPL recognized on CRN 2024 Elite 150 Managed Service Provider List.
- 2024: the company was recognized as the top systems integrator by Systems Contractor News.

== Associations ==
AVI-SPL is a founding partner of the AV Global Alliance, the company has a worldwide footprint that encompasses 30 countries and currently includes 28 partner companies.
