= Highfive (company) =

American company

Highfive is an American video conferencing company which combines cloud-based software with its proprietary in-room video conferencing hardware. The company, established in 2012 by former Google employee Shan Sinha, has its headquarters in Redwood City, California. In 2016, Fortune named Highfive on its list of the "10 Best Small Workplaces in Technology.". In September 2020, Highfive is acquired by Dialpad

== History ==
Highfive was founded in 2012 by Shan Sinha and Jeremy Roy. Sinha, who was one of the developers of Google Drive, noticed while working for Google that there was a very high demand for videoconferencing, with tens of thousands of video calls regularly made. He left Google to found Highfive, believing that the market leader, Skype, was not “secure or robust enough for business needs.” Sinha’s vision for Highfive is to “make videoconferencing as commonplace as e-mail in business.” After it was established, the company worked in stealth mode as Parlay Labs from 2012 until Highfive’s launch in October, 2014. In March, 2015 Highfive announced that they had raised over $45 million in total venture capital. Investors in the firm include General Catalyst Partners, Google Ventures, Andreessen Horowitz, Drew Houston, Aaron Levie, Marc Benioff (Salesforce.com) and Shishir Mehrotra (YouTube).

In March, 2016 the company announced a 341% growth in customers during 2015 and that it had surpassed the milestone of one million call minutes per week from over 1400 customers. In an interview with Jim Cramer, Sinha commented on the market success: "We are seeing some really big secular trends happening that are causing people to be more comfortable with video. The new workforce is all at an age now that they grew up with video.” In May, Highfive announced that they had incorporated telephone conferencing service Dolby Voice into its services.

== Services ==
Highfive’s software is cloud-based and linked to its in-room video conferencing device. Its applications work on personal computers, iPhone, iPad or Android devices, and require little time to set up. Bluetooth technology enables calls to be initiated on a mobile device or tablet and then beamed onto a large TV screen, which the Los Angeles Times likened to “an Apple TV with a 1080p HD camera and a microphone with a 30-foot range attached.” ‘’Entrepreneur’’ wrote of the product: “Each device delivers HD video and high-fidelity audio. Installation is easy and straightforward. The interface is intuitive. There are no extra cables or wires; instead, each user downloads a special extension for the Google Chrome web browser, which allows the system to share screens wirelessly from the main interface onto individual employees’ laptops or smartphones.”

Sinha stated in a March, 2015 interview with Bloomberg that video conference equipment market leaders such as Cisco, Polycom and Huawei have wealthier, IT savvy customers who are the "only ones who can afford the complexity and the cost of those systems, which are entirely too hard to use.” He argues that Highfive is unique because it offers a product of comparable quality and better functionality, available for businesses of all sizes, in any room, at 1/20 of the cost. Philipp Karcher, a senior analyst with Cambridge, Massachusetts based Forrester Research concurred that Highfive’s strength lies in it accessibility to smaller firms and its relatively lower cost.

A Polycom-sponsored study conducted by Wainhouse Research found that Highfive was "going after a market of about 30 million to 50 million meeting rooms." Known clients include Mimeo.com, Warby Parker, Shutterfly, Evernote, Patagonia, Slack, and Zenefits. Fortune states that in June, 2016 Highfive now faces competition from Logitech, Lifesize, Huawei, and ZTE in targeting smaller firms with video conferencing services.

== Surveys ==
Highfive has become known for its surveys into workforce habits. In September, 2015 Highfive commissioned a poll, in which they surveyed 1200 office employees on distractions during the workday. In June, 2016 the company, in conjunction with Zogby Analytics, conducted a video conferencing survey which found that nearly half of the 800 respondents found video conferencing unsettling due to being conscious of their appearance on camera.

== See also ==
- Telecollaboration
- Teleconference
- Videotelephony
