= AVer Information =

Taiwanese technology manufacturer

AVer Information Inc. 圓展科技股份有限公司

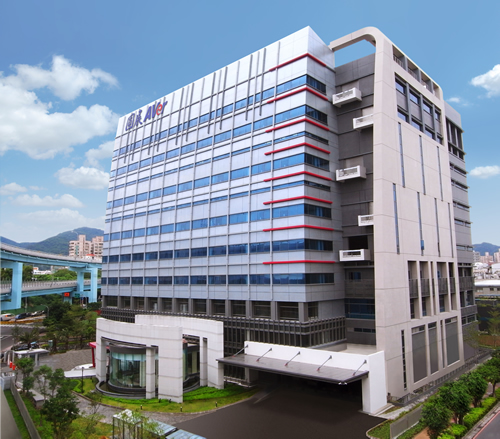
- AVer's headquarters in Taiwan
- Type: Public
- Traded as: TWSE: 3669
- Industry: Education technology, Video collaboration, Pro AV, Telehealth
- Founded: 2008 (as AVerMedia Information, Inc.)
- Headquarters: New Taipei, Taiwan
- Area served: Worldwide
- Key people: Michael Kuo (Co-founder and Chairman), James Chang (Co-founder), Andy Hsi (CEO), David Kuo (President)
- Products: Visualizers Distance Learning Cameras Video Conferencing Solutions Pro AV Solutions Medical Grade Cameras
- Revenue: $56 million (2025)
- Number of employees: Approx. 616 (June 2026)
- Website: www.aver.com

AVer Information Inc. (Chinese: 圓展科技股份有限公司; pinyin: Yuánzhǎn Kējì Gǔfèn Yǒuxiàn Gōngsī) (TWSE: 3669) is an education, business communication, professional audio-video, and telehealth solution provider headquartered in the Tucheng District, New Taipei City, Taiwan. AVer is best known for its camera technology, including visualizers (document cameras), USB video conferencing cameras, video bars, Pro AV Auto Tracking cameras, medical grade cameras, and more. The company also offers other related products, such as interactive flat panels, mobile device charging carts, microphone systems, and speakerphones. The devices are supported through various types of AVer camera management software.

== History ==
Michael Kuo founded AVerMedia Technology in 1990. In January 2008, AVer Information Inc. was established to become an independent company focusing on the education and business markets. On July 1, 2011, AVer Information Inc. separated from AVerMedia Group. On August 25, 2011, it became a publicly listed company in Taiwan after they placed an initial public offering (IPO) on the Taiwan Stock Exchange.

In 2010, AVer built a 450,000-square-foot (42,000 m^{2}) building in New Taipei City, Taiwan as its global headquarters. In 2013, AVer expanded their operations to the United States to a new 63,000-square-foot (5,900 m^{2}) office in Fremont, California. In 2014, the AVer "User Experience Design Center" was established to provide an interactive product experience.

== Selected Notable Products ==
- 2012: U15, W30, M70
- 2013: EVC130, FD Series, FV Series, FC Series, Rugged Series
- 2014: AVerVision315AF, F50HD, EVC Series, P5000 Series
- 2015: U50, F70W, CAM520, CAM530
- 2016: M70HD
- 2017: Orbit Series, CAM340, FONE520
- 2018: U70+, CAM540, VB342, PTC500S, PTZ300 Series
- 2019: M15W, M70W, EP65, CAM340+, VB342+
- 2020: M90UHD, CAM520 Pro, PTC300 Series
- 2021: DL30, DL10, CAM130, CAM520 Pro 2, VB130
- 2022: F50+, A30, CAM550, VB342 Pro, MD330U(I)
- 2023: U50+, CAM570, CAM520 Pro3, VB350, MT300(N), MD120UI
- 2024: SA-A5, FONE700, TR535 Series, MD720UIS
- 2025: M11WB, MT100, VB150, HUB35-EXT35, TR615
- 2026: MT100S, MT500, MD331UI

== Quality Standards ==
AVer maintains multiple management system certifications, including ISO 9001, ISO 14001, ISO 13485, ISO 45001, ISO 27001, ISO 14064-1, IECQ QC 080000, RoHS & REACH, WEEE, and OHSAS 18001.

== Corporate Information ==
AVer Information's global operations are directed by co-founder and chairman Michael Kuo, CEO Andy Hsi, and President David Kuo from AVer's world headquarters in New Taipei City, Taiwan.

The company has branch offices located in the United States, France, the Netherlands, Japan, Vietnam, and South Korea, as well as local sales representatives in Indonesia and Thailand.

The United States branch office handles AVer's operations in the United States, Canada, and Latin America and is overseen by United States co-founder and president Arthur Pait.
