= MeBeam =

Video chat website

- Website type: instant messaging
- Owner: Ashod Apakian
- Creator: Ashod Apakian
- Revenue: advertising
- Website: www.mebeam.com
- Launched: November 2007
- Current status: Defunct

MeBeam was a video chat website that allowed any user to create videoconference rooms for up to 16 people. MeBeam did not require registration, login or any software download.

== Overview ==
The site was launched by Ashod Apakian in November 2007 as a web-based demo of a research application he was working on. The goal was to create the world's fastest videotelephony site. It gained popularity after a plugin was developed to provide multi-party videoconferencing for Adium in August 2008, after being featured on Digg.

The site was also featured on Chris Pirillo, at which point it gained widespread usage.

The website used Adobe Systems Flash Player to display video and access the user's webcam. It works across Windows, Linux and Macintosh, along with any web browser supports Flash 8.

== See also ==
- Online chat
- Web chat
