= SightSpeed =

Videoconferencing company

- Developers: SightSpeed Inc. (Logitech)
- Final release: 6.0 / 1 March 2007
- Operating system: Windows or macOS
- Type: Videoconferencing, VoIP, instant messaging
- Website: sightspeed.com at the Wayback Machine (archived 2006-05-28)

SightSpeed is a videoconferencing company, supplying VoIP and instant messaging app for Windows and macOS operating systems. The service allows people to make video calls, computer-to-computer voice calls, and calls to regular telephones, with free and paid versions.

In October 2008, the company was acquired by Logitech for $30 million. The Logitech Vid service is based on SightSpeed's technology. Due to competing software, the Logitech Vid video calling service will be discontinued as of 1 July 2013 and the downloading of the product has already been terminated. As a result, Logitech is no longer accepting new account registrations.

== Limitations ==
The main criticisms are:

- Lack of true privacy features such as encryption.
- SightSpeed "Phone Out" does not support outbound caller ID in the United States, where people commonly reject calls from unrecognized numbers. The recipient sees "unknown" or a blank field instead of the caller ID number.
- Though it uses the SIP standard it is not interoperable with SIP networks and can only be used with a SightSpeed account.
