= Alfaview =

Lip-synchronized video conference software

alfaview
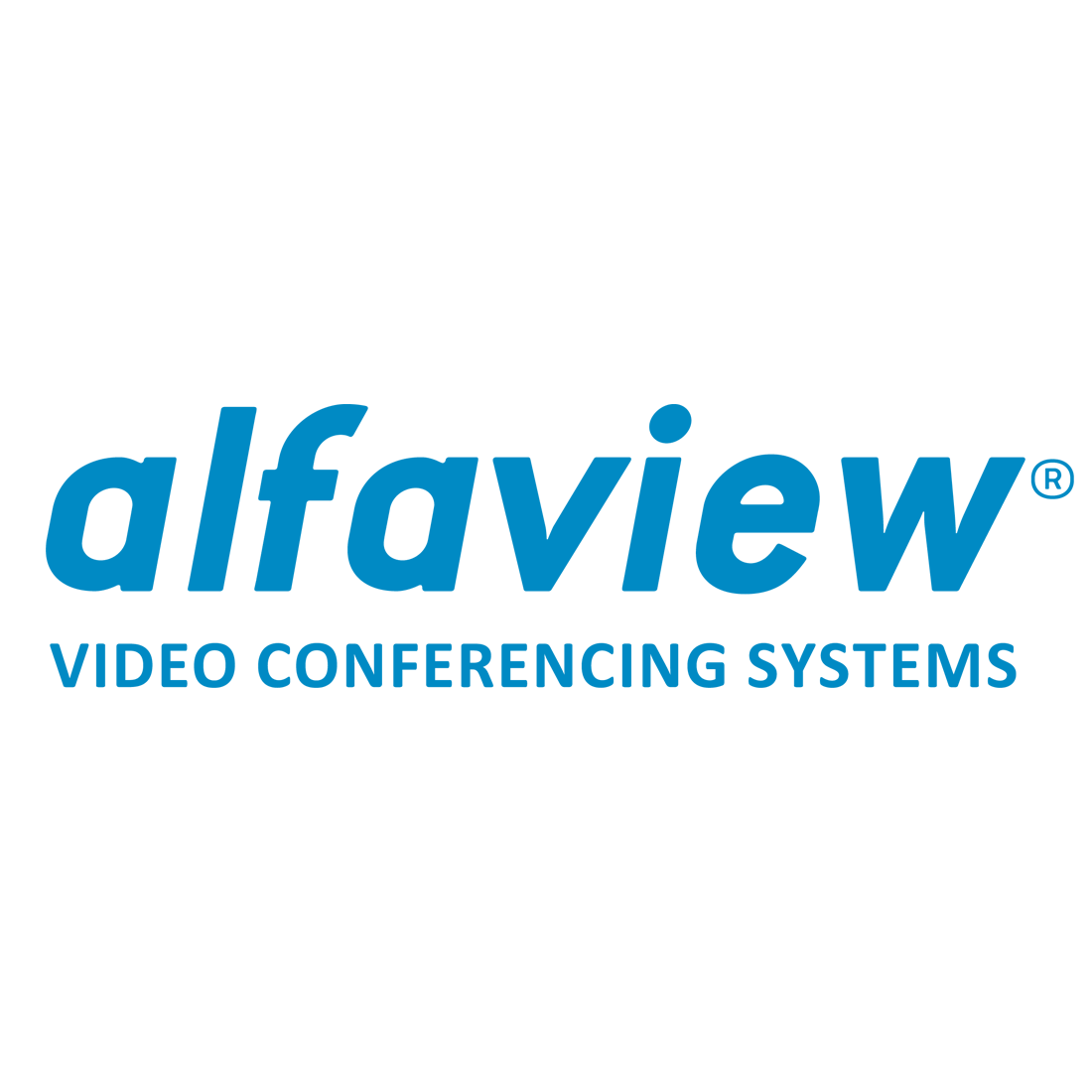
- Developers: alfaview (Karlsruhe, Germany)
- Initial release: 2016
- Stable release: 8.32.0
- Operating system: Windows, macOS, iOS, Android, Linux
- Available in: German, English
- Type: Video conferencing system
- License: proprietary
- Website: https://alfaview.com/

alfaview is a software for lip-synchronized video conferences, specializing in virtual online meetings, seminars, training sessions and conferences. It was developed in Germany.

The servers are located within the European Union. Only ISO/IEC 27001-certified data centers are used and the data is encrypted according to TLS/AES256.

== History ==
alfaview has its origins in 2010. The education company alfatraining Bildungszentrum GmbH developed its first prototype of alfaview for all their trainings of skilled workers in Germany. Since 2016 the application alfaview is distributed on the platform alfaview.com by alfaview gmbh. Owner and founder is the Greek entrepreneur Niko Fostiropoulos. The headquarters is located in Karlsruhe, Germany.

== Features ==
More than 200 users can be connected via audio and video in the live conference rooms. The viewer mode allows 500 users to participate simultaneously. The video conferencing system includes features such as a chat, where the users of the virtual room can write text messages, collaborative tools (white board, surveys, voting), breakout rooms, desktop sharing, live transcription of the spoken word in the room and the live translation into many languages. A toolbox to integrate collaborative programmes (whiteboard, survey, voting) is available to users. Furthermore, alfaview offers the feature of using simultaneous interpreters.

In the virtual rooms, individual users can be designated moderators.

Private users can download the video conference software for free. Companies can buy it for their internal and external communication and configure it according to their needs.

== Data protection ==
The video conferencing platform alfaview is GDPR-compliant. In February 2021, alfaview received four "green lights" from the Data Protection and Freedom of Information Commissioner of the State of Berlin in all four categories on both the legal and on the technical level. The servers used for the provision of the video conferencing platform are located in Germany, if necessary in other member states of the European Union. Only ISO 27001-certified data centres are used and the data is encrypted according to current standards (TLS/AES256). The data processing agreement (DPA) and technical-organisational measures (TOM) are provided by the company.

== Distribution ==
Apart from individuals and businesses, alfaview is increasingly used by education institutions. More than 20.000 institutions with over 1 million users are currently using the software. Several universities, universities of applied sciences and schools are using the video conferencing system for teaching in virtual classrooms., among others the Pforzheim University of Applied Sciences, the Karlsruhe Institute of Technology, the Stuttgart Media University, the Baden-Württemberg Cooperative State University, the Ravensburg University of Cooperative Education and the Hochschule Furtwangen University. alfaview is increasingly used in schools. German Several Chambers of Trades in Germany use the video conferencing system as well, for example for their digital master craftsman's examination. The 2020 nationwide final of the business plan and simulation competition Jugend gründet was held as a live stream via the software.

Apart from the Centre for Civic Education, various municipalities in Germany are using the software, among others the city of Karlsruhe, the city of Gütersloh or the rural district Oder-Spree.

During the COVID-19 pandemic, the company and the Karlsruhe Sandkorn Theater have implemented a virtual play in the virtual meeting room.

Furthermore, alfaview is used for virtual events and digital exhibitions. For example, the international trade fairs INTERGEO and Nanotextnology or the Forum Bildung Digitalisierung were conducted virtually with alfaview.

SAP Deutschland SE offers its own training courses via alfaview, the so-called SAP Live Class. In 2018, SAP Live Class with alfaview was awarded the Silver Award in the category "Best Advance in Technology for Virtual-Classroom or Conferencing Technology" by the Brandon Hall Group.

alfaview is also used in studio productions and at Bundesliga matches to virtually integrate an audience into the event. In May 2021, the final show of Germany's Next Topmodel with Heidi Klum was the first show in which 500 spectators were virtually brought into the studio via alfaview using a video wall. In February 2021, over 100 fans were brought into the stadium live on LED screens during the handball Bundesliga match between the Berlin Füchse and the Rhein-Neckar-Löwen.
