= Stickam =

Live-streaming video website

- Company type: Privately held company
- Available in: 3 languages
- Founded: 2005, rebranded in 2022
- Dissolved: 2013 rebooted 2022
- Headquarters: Los Angeles, California, US
- Owners: Stickam Worldwide, Inc
- Key people: Hideki Kishioka, James Johnson, Andy Wombwell
- Registration: Free
- Current status: Defunct 2013, rebooted 2022

Stickam was a live-streaming video website that launched in 2005. Stickam featured user-submitted pictures, audio, video, and most prominently, live streaming video chat. The site quickly expanded to include live shows and produced content from MTV, G4 TV, CBS Radio, NATPE, CES, and many others, as well as live performances and shows with numerous musicians and celebrities.

In addition to streaming their live video on Stickam, the service allowed users to embed their streaming webcam feeds into other web sites via a Flash player. The name "Stickam" referred to this ability to "stick" a webcam feed onto another site.

Stickam shut down in early 2013.

In 2022, Stickam was rebooted with a similar logo, but focusing solely on adult content.

== Features ==
=== Go Live ===
Anyone could "go live" and broadcast live video on Stickam from their computer, iPhone or iPad within seconds. It was also possible to connect HD and other cameras, mixers, and audio feeds to send HD and professional broadcast streams out via Stickam. Stickam's live video players came with built-in chat capabilities, allowing both text chat and optional video chat. Stickam's player and live stream abilities were recognized in a Variety magazine article as a "more customizable player" that had the ability to engage fans in a powerful way using their virtual face-to-face interaction.

=== Social media login ===
Stickam launched its social login feature at VidCon 2012 (where Stickam had teamed with Maker Studios to live stream VidCon 2012). Broadcasters on Stickam could allow their friends and followers to log into their chat rooms by using Facebook, Twitter, YouTube, Tumblr, LinkedIn, Myspace, or Gmail. Broadcasters could further restrict their rooms by requiring viewers to like their Facebook page, follow their Twitter, or subscribe to their YouTube channel in order to view the stream or in order to participate in the chat. Stickam called this feature "fangating" and first deployed it on a concert event that was sponsored by Levi's Jeans. This feature was created to help Stickam users increase their YouTube followers.

=== VIP program ===
Stickam had as of August 2012 a VIP user program. The VIP program gave users ad-free usage as well as being featured on the "who's live" page, 25 coins from the shuffle marketplace and a VIP badge on the user's profile picture.

=== Stream API ===
The company also released a white-label service called StreamAPI (formerly Stickam API) in 2008. StreamAPI was a customizable white label service that allowed customers to add live streaming to their website or application with no development experience required.

== Content ==
=== Bands and musicians ===
Christian hard rock band Underoath used Stickam to stream live from their recording studio for two months while they recorded their album Lost In The Sound Of Separation, racking up over 1.8 million live views. They returned to Stickam for a live listening party right before the album's release.

Smashing Pumpkins' Billy Corgan went live on Stickam to host Gothageddon, which featured toy dolls wrestling each other. Billy and friends voiced the dolls, which included dolls representing the members of Smashing Pumpkins, Robert Smith from The Cure, Amanda Palmer from Dresden Dolls, and many others.

=== Live events and partnerships ===
On November 7, 2012, Stickam officially launched its new Stickam Studio At Meltdown at Meltdown Comics on Sunset Blvd. Stickam and Meltdown announced they had partnered to stream live shows from a new studio space in the store as well as from the store floor itself and from the NerdMelt Theatre behind the store. The studio programming launched with the premiere of IHEARTCOMIX LIVE with guests Andrew W.K. and Cherie Lily and a live video commentary show by NerdTerns.

Stickam partnered with Vans Warped Tour to stream live exclusive coverage of the 2012 tour as well as promotional fan chats with many the bands in the weeks leading up to the tour kickoff. Bands that participated included Breathe Carolina, Mayday Parade, Of Mice & Men, and Pierce the Veil. Stickam also provided live coverage of Warped 2011 through a deal with the band Gym Class Heroes streaming from every single tour date.

Stickam and Levi's partnered to stream MusicfestNW, the third largest indoor music festival in the United States.

Stickam teamed with Chevy Sonic for the live presentation "Sonic Live" featuring a performance and Q&A with reggae band SOJA on February 8, 2012.

=== Charity events ===
Since 2007, Stickam was home to the annual UNICEF fundraiser known as Stickaid hosted by YouTube vlogger Myles Dyer. This event is regarded as the world's first webathon style fundraiser and has raised more than $100,000 over its lifespan. Since Stickam's closure, Stickaid has moved to YouTube as its live streaming partner and still retains its name.

On May 27, 2011, Stickam organized the 14-hour webathon concert event Stickam Live For Japan to raise money to help those affected by the March 11, 2011 tsunami in Japan. The event streamed live from The Roxy nightclub in Los Angeles and featured emcee Stu Stone with performers Cypress Hill, Black Veil Brides, and Alex Lambert along with dozens more. Money raised benefitted the Red Cross, the Japanese Red Cross Society, and GlobalGiving.

Stickam heavily featured and promoted the annual fundraising marathon to benefit Ronald McDonald House Charities of Memphis Charities each year in partnership with Memphis radio station Rock 103.

== Social features ==
"Social users" refers to people who used Stickam primarily for its social features, including hosting their own videochats or participating in one of the site's group chat rooms.

=== Stickam Shuffle ===
In February 2010, Stickam also launched Stickam Shuffle, where users could connect instantly to random people from all over the world. Stickam's policy promised that violators of its terms of service would be permanently banned.

=== Video chat ===
Live Chat allowed the user to display their webcam live feed over the internet. The user had the ability to choose who could view their live stream. In the actual stream room, there were 7 camera spots. The largest one was for the owner of the chat. The other six spots were for six other people to stream their live webcam feed. The live chat also allowed users to chat through a chat box similar to what one would see on any regular chat site. The main user could "kick" or ban people who were disruptive or threatening. The main user also had the power to make people moderators which were trusted people who could kick people if the main user was unable to do so.

=== Group chat rooms ===
Chat rooms were for many users to chat in, instead of live with only 7 camera spots. It allowed everyone the ability to stream live at once, but only 12 people could be seen at a given time. The chat rooms had many of the same properties that live chats did. If one encountered a group of chatters with similar characters preceding a user name, it was considered a "crew tag". Group chats were organized by topic (like "Video gaming" instead of by a specific host broadcaster name the way the rest of Stickam was) and group chats stayed active 24/7.

=== User advertising program ===
Starting in March 2012, Stickam launched a program that would allow users to purchase advertising space that would run during their broadcasts on-screen. Stickam's Executive Director Hideki Kishioka said in an interview about the subletting of overlay advertising space that "Among our 9.3 million registered users there are many musicians we especially want to help reach their fans in a cost-effective manner."

== Closure ==
On January 30, 2013, Stickam announced the permanent shutdown of their service effective January 31.

In 2022, Stickam was relaunched as an adult entertainment website.

== Security ==
Stickam had a team of administrators who monitored site activity and dealt with reports of abuse. To join Stickam one had to be at least 14 years of age. Stickam users created their own privacy settings.

In July 2010, Stickam Worldwide Chairwoman Pamela Day recorded a video addressing the problem of online bullies and predators, discussing the safety measures Stickam took after an incident involving an 11-year-old called Jessi Slaughter who received death threats after making controversial postings laden with profanity and talk of violence, and noting that Stickam ultimately banned the minor from their service due to her underage status. Stickam subsequently adopted a "zero tolerance" policy that bans for life "any member who attempts to share nudity, cyber bully and harass other users, or is identified as an online predator."

== Ownership ==
Stickam was owned by Stickam Worldwide, Inc.

The company was launched as a division of Advanced Video Communications (AVC), a company founded in 2004 and specializing in internet video streaming technologies. Stickam was launched by AVC in February 2005. In addition to Stickam, AVC's products and services include a video conferencing service and LiveLine, a low-cost home surveillance system based on IP camera technology. Advanced Video Communications is a privately held company owned and managed by Japanese entrepreneur Wataru Takahashi.

In 2007 and 2008, The New York Times reported that in addition to AVC, Takahashi was also owner of DTI Services, an amalgam of adult websites aimed at the Japanese market. DTI (DTI Services, Inc. and DI Serve Limited) adult websites include DXLive, EXshot, and JGirl Paradise and contain content ranging from adult manga to sexually-explicit webcam shows to uncensored Japanese adult video. The 2007 article also reports that the sites were based in the US due to Japanese laws restricting certain types of nudity.

According to Alex Becker (alias Alexandre Despallières), who was a vice-president at Stickam for four months in 2007 before leaving the company, Stickam shares office space, employees, and computer systems with the DTI adult websites. Becker was critical of the practice of sharing employees between Stickam and the adult sites and states that he left because he thought the company was not doing enough to protect teenage users of the site from sexual predators and other dangers. A spokesman for Stickam denied Becker's allegations that Stickam was negligent about protecting its users, and also stated that Becker's claims were "retaliatory", motivated by a disagreement over a contract with the company, and the stating that after leaving AVC, Becker was working on a site that would be in competition with Stickam.

As a follow-up to the 2007 story in The New York Times, Bloomberg Businessweek in 2012 published an article by the same reporter, Brad Stone, reporting how Stone had been tricked into writing the first story by a disgruntled former contractor who had falsely claimed to be an employee and who provided a lot of false information. The former contractor has also since served jail time in France and stands accused of forgery and murder and other crimes unrelated to his time at the company.

== See also ==
- Chatroulette
- Omegle
