= LifeCam =

Webcam for PCs

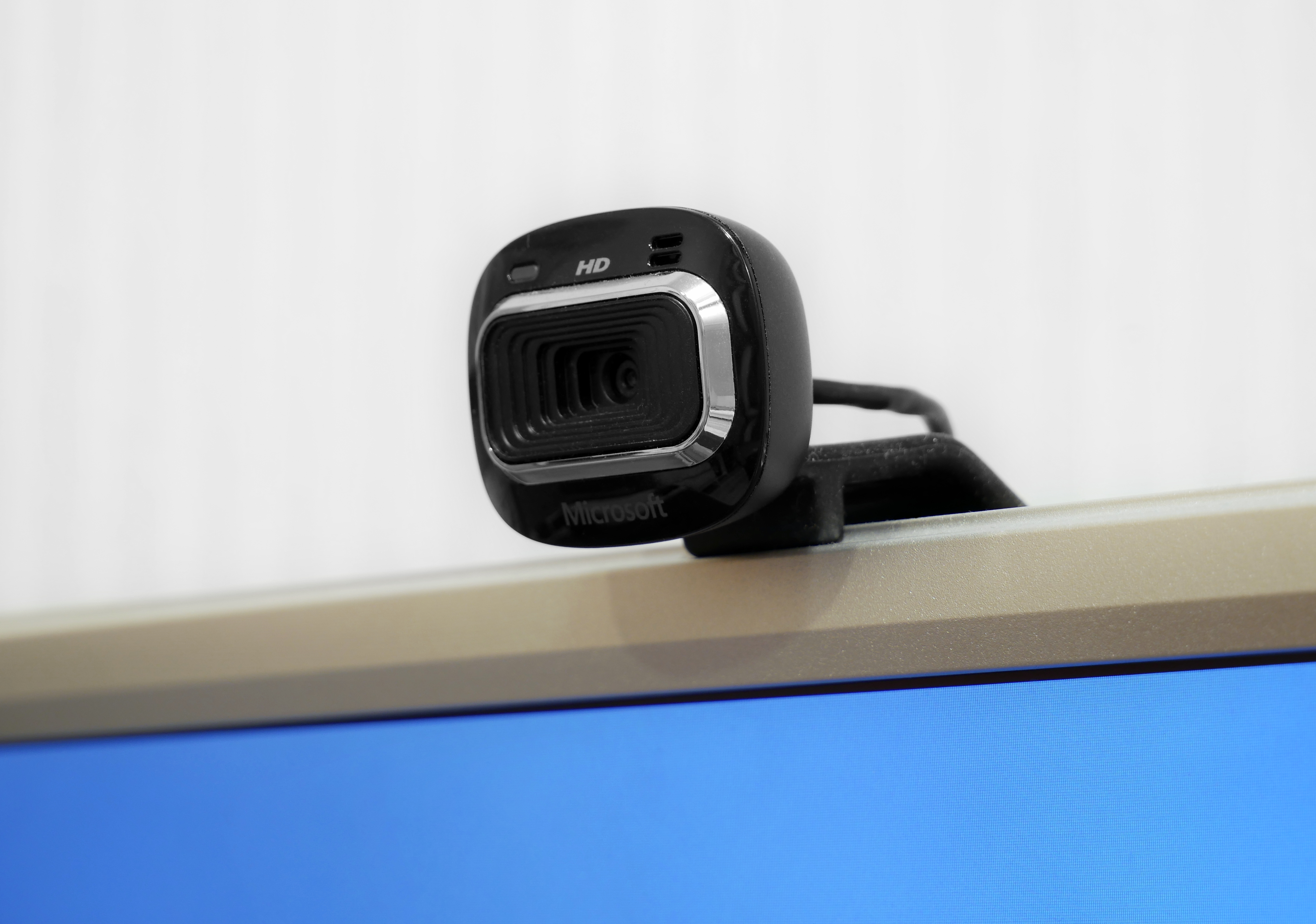
A LifeCam HD-3000 webcam sitting on top of a monitor

The LifeCam is a lineup of webcams from Microsoft for PC users produced from 2006 to 2023. Various models and series of webcams are designed for either laptops or desktops.

== VX Series ==
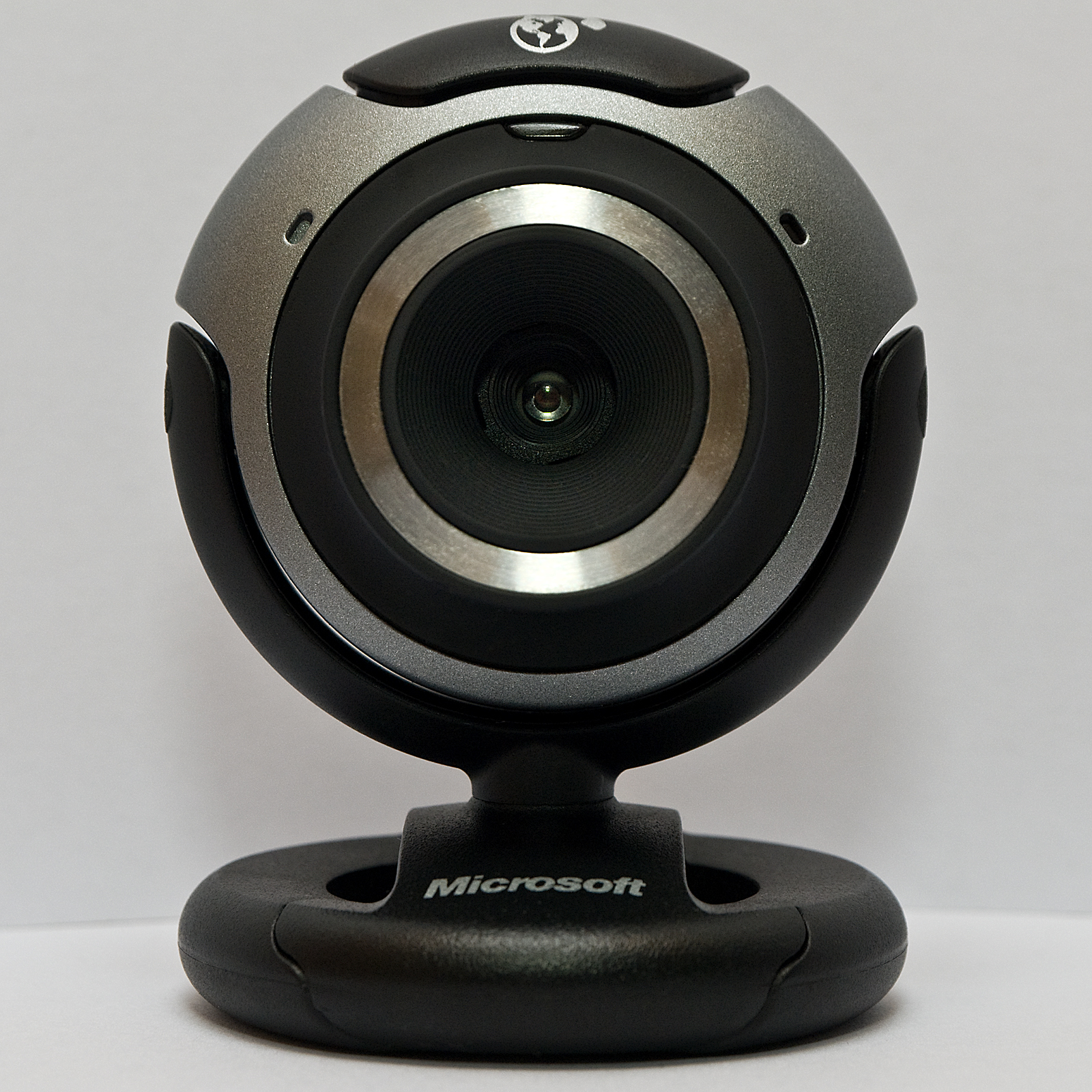
LifeCam VX-3000

=== History ===
The VX series of Microsoft LifeCam debuted on 13 June 2006, and were available for sale in August 2006, as Microsoft's first entry into selling webcams, with only two models, the VX-3000 and VX-6000. One of the exclusive features include the integration with Windows Live Messenger, by having a Windows Live Call button that can be used to easily initiate a video call.

These models both feature a similar round body design, with a round base, known as the Universal Attachment Base.

The entire series was designed for desktop use, as it used a base for attaching it to a desktop monitor. All webcams of this series interface via USB.

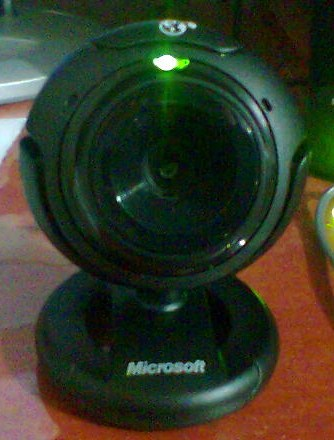
LifeCam VX-1000

=== Specifications ===
Model	Released	Video Resolution	Image Sensor	Built in Microphone	Remarks
VX-500	2008 May	640 x 480	0.3 MP	No	
VX-700	2008 Aug	640 x 480	0.3 MP	Yes	Seems to be available in selected markets only.
VX-800	Japan - 2009 Sept Spain - 2009 Oct International - 2011	640 x 480	0.3 MP	Yes	Part Number JSD-00007, was released in 2011, while JSD-00014 was released a year later.
VX-1000	2006 Sept	640 x 480	0.3 MP	Yes	Universal attachment base
VX-2000	2009 May	640 x 480	1.3 MP	Yes	
VX-3000	2006 June	640 x 480	1.3 MP	Yes	Automatic face tracking software Universal attachment base Pan, tilt and zoom
VX-5000	2008 May	640 x 480	1.3 MP	Yes	Flexible Stand Available in three colour variants: Fire Red; Cool Blue; Lucky Green
VX-5500	2008 Sept	640 x 480	1.3 MP	Yes	Swappable plastic front covers (in white, blue and red)
VX-6000	2006 June	1280 x 1024	1.3 MP (5.0MP Interpolated)	Yes	Wide-angle lens No Automatic face tracking software Universal attachment base Pan, tilt and zoom
VX-7000	2007 Sept	1600 x 1200	2.0 MP (7.6 MP Interpolated)	Yes	

== NX Series ==
All webcams of the NX series are designed for notebooks and interfaces via USB 2.0.

=== Specifications ===
Model	Released	Life Call Button Rated Actuations	Field of View	Video Resolution	Image Sensor	Built in Microphone	Remarks
NX-3000	2007 Sept	5,000	55° Diagonal	640 x 480 (0.3MP)	0.3MP 1.3MP Interpolated	Yes	Face-tracking, digital pan, tilt, and 3x zoom are not available for 640 x 480 video capture.
NX-6000	2006 Sept	10,000	71° Diagonal	1600 x 1190 (2.0MP)	CMOS 2.0MP 7.6MP Interpolated	Yes	Face-tracking, digital pan, tilt, and 3x zoom are not available for 640 x 480 video capture.

== LifeCam Show ==
- 2.0 megapixel sensor
- 8.0 megapixel still images (interpolated)
- 21-60" focused depth of field (fixed focus)
- 71-degree wide angle lens
- Comes with many attachments: Magnet disc, clip, and its own stand—it can be used on both desktop and laptop computers.
- Released: Sep 2008

== LifeCam Cinema ==
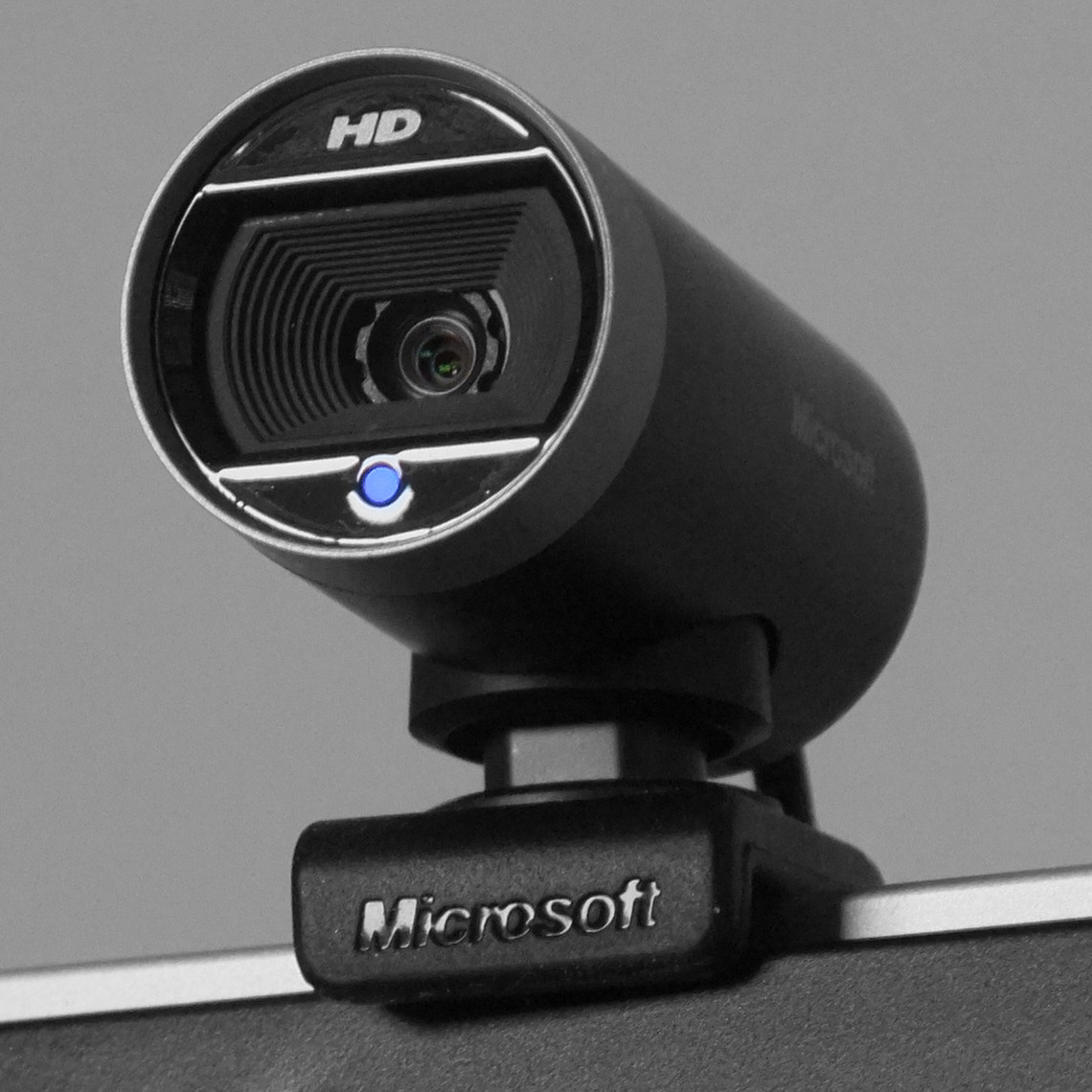
LifeCam Cinema

- 720p 16:9 1/4" OmniVision OV9712 Sensor
- 5.0 megapixel still images (interpolated)
- Autofocus
- Built-in microphone
- 73,5-degree wide angle glass lens
- 4"-∞ depth of field (autofocus)
- Released: Aug 2009

== LifeCam Studio ==
- 1080p 16:9 Sensor
- 8.0 megapixel still images (interpolated)
- Autofocus
- Built-in microphone
- 75-degree wide angle glass lens
- Tripod thread
- Released: Sep 2010

== HD Series ==
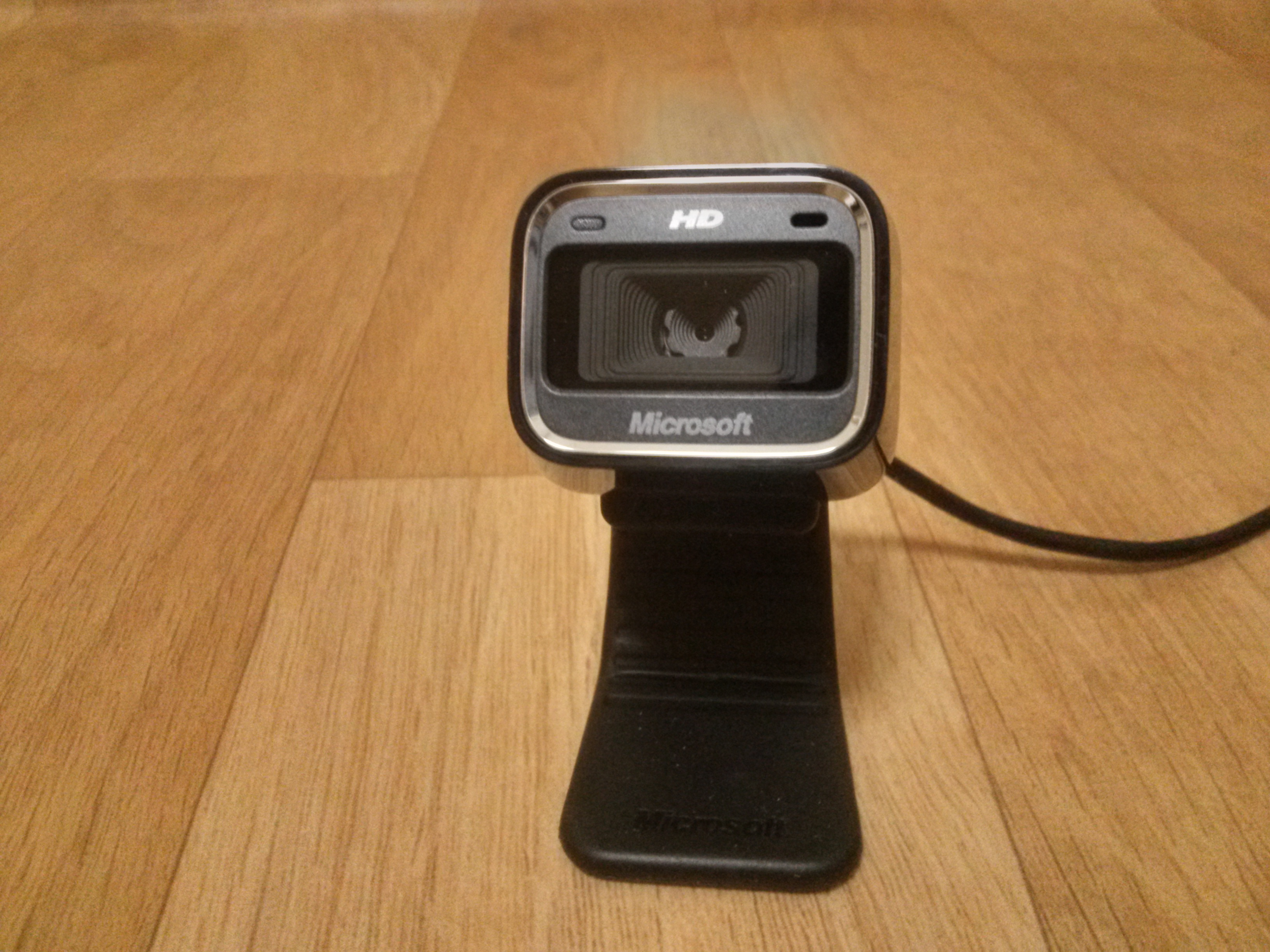
LifeCam HD-5000

These series debuted in March 2010 and uses Microsoft's TrueColor technology for improved color balance. They all have 720p HD video resolution and have built-in microphones.

=== Specifications ===
Model	Released	Video Resolution	Image Sensor	Auto focus	Remarks
HD-3000	2011 Feb	1280 x 720	4 MP	No	Lacks video effects.
HD-5000	2010 Mar	1280 x 720	4 MP	Yes	
HD-5001	2010 Mar	1280 x 720	4 MP	Yes	Best Buy exclusive
HD-6000	2010 May	1280 x 720	4 MP	Yes	Designed for notebook users.
