= StarLeaf =

Defunct videoconferencing company and platform

- Type: Private company
- Industry: Telecommunications, Videotelephony
- Founded: 2008; 18 years ago
- Founders: Mark Loney, Mark Richer and William MacDonald
- Headquarters: Watford, Hertfordshire
- Number of employees: 190 (2021)

StarLeaf was a global video conferencing and collaboration software company that provided cloud-based Instant messaging, meeting and calling for business users. StarLeaf enabled people to meet and collaborate from their desktop and mobile devices, as well as via proprietary StarLeaf and third-party meeting room systems. The company was headquartered near Watford, UK, with offices throughout Europe, the Americas and Australasia.

On 9 June 2022 Starleaf Limited entered into administration and its services and videoconferencing platform ceased operation in October 2022.

== History ==
StarLeaf was established in 2008 by Mark Loney, Mark Richer and William MacDonald. The trio had previously founded Calista, which offered cloud based voice services and which was purchased by Cisco Systems in 1999, and Codian, a UK-based manufacturer of video conferencing infrastructure that was bought by Tandberg for $270m in 2007 and subsequently became part of Cisco Systems in 2010.

StarLeaf initially developed a telepresence and video meeting service that offered a range of personal and group telepresence endpoints connected via a dedicated on-premise PBX.

In 2013, the company launched StarLeaf Cloud, a global network managed by StarLeaf with regional points of presence, to which StarLeaf endpoints could connect from anywhere. StarLeaf ceased selling on-prem systems in favour of StarLeaf Cloud.

In the same year, the introduction of the StarLeaf Breeze software client enabled people to join StarLeaf meetings from laptops (Windows, Mac OS, and Linux) smartphones and tablets (iOS and Android), as well as from a range of StarLeaf personal videophones and meeting room systems.

In 2015, StarLeaf introduced a dedicated room system for Skype for Business/Microsoft UC. In 2018 this was rebranded as "Teamline by StarLeaf" and was extended to work with Microsoft Teams.

In 2017 launched their new app for Windows, Mac, iOS and Android. In addition to being able to make calls and join meetings, it added instant messaging functionality. File sharing was added in 2018.

StarLeaf announced a partnership with Poly in 2020 to make StarLeaf services available on Poly conferencing and meeting room systems.

Usage of StarLeaf grew by over 1,000% between January and April 2020 as global lockdowns led to a dramatic increase in home and remote working.

In 2021, StarLeaf transitioned from hardware led sales to being a SaaS based offering.

StarLeaf was VC-backed and had secured eight funding rounds totaling almost £60m, the last £12m of which came in 2019 with investment from Grafton Capital and Highland Capital Partners.

On 9 June 2022 Starleaf Limited entered into administration. Operations ceased in October 2022.

== Functionality ==
The StarLeaf platform provided video calling, meetings, and messaging. Functionality was available through its apps for Windows, Mac, iOS and Android and through StarLeaf and third party room systems.

=== Meetings ===
Users had the ability to schedule meetings, either through the StarLeaf portal or using Outlook or Google Calendar plug-ins. Meetings had capacity for up to 300 video participants.

Additional video conferencing and calling features included blurred and virtual backgrounds, background noise cancellation, screen sharing, in-meeting chat and participant management.

Meetings could be recorded via integration with rec.vc.

=== Calling ===
StarLeaf apps and devices could be used to make audio or video calls, either to other StarLeaf users, H.323 addresses, SIP addresses, or when configured with a SIP trunk, PSTN telephone numbers. It is possible to add additional participants to turn the call into a meeting.

=== Instant Messaging ===
Users could create one-on-one chats with other users, or create group chats with multiple users.

Each message could contain an attachment, for instance a photo or document. Messages could be replied to or forwarded to other chats.

Chats could be archived, or blocked.

=== Room systems ===
StarLeaf sold its own range of room systems. The GT Mini consisted of a codec and touch screen with support for dual screens and up to two microphones. It could be used with a wide-angle camera for smaller rooms or a PTZ camera for larger rooms.

The StarLeaf Huddle combined the codec and touch screen into a single device, with a wide angle camera and microphone.

StarLeaf sold Pronto cable accessory for its meeting rooms which when plugged into your laptop's USB A or USB C port, instantly transferred any meetings the user had been invited to onto the room system for one touch join. It also allowed for screen sharing, even on laptops without an HDMI port.

Through its partnership with Poly, StarLeaf had integration with the Poly Studio X30, Studio X50 and G7500.

In addition to being able to join StarLeaf meetings, StarLeaf rooms were also able to join third party meetings such as Zoom or Teams as long as they had H.323 or SIP access enabled.

StarLeaf also supported SIP and H.323 endpoint registration from third party room systems.

=== Platform ===
Calls via StarLeaf were encrypted and the company had been ISO/IEC 27001 certified since 2019. StarLeaf provided an industry-leading 99.999% uptime guarantee (effectively no more than 5.5 minutes of unplanned downtime per year). Customers had control over where StarLeaf stored their organisation's data (data sovereignty).

The web-based StarLeaf management portal provided controls and analytics for administrators.

== Architecture ==
StarLeaf hosted 15 points of presence (as of 2019) worldwide. Each customer was assigned to a specific point of presence, in a data jurisdiction of their choosing, that contained the organisation's data and hosted any meetings. Data was replicated a second data center in the same data jurisdiction for fail-over purposes.
