= Paltalk =

Video group chat service

Paltalk Messenger
- Developer: AVM Software

Stable release(s)
- Android: 9.2.1.0 / December 23, 2021; 4 years ago
- iOS: 8.4.2 / November 9, 2021; 4 years ago
- License: Proprietary
- Website: www.paltalk.com

Paltalk is a proprietary video group chat service that enables users to communicate by video, Internet chat, or voice.

== History ==
In 2007, the filmed suicide of one of the service's users was widely reported in the media. Concerns were raised over the possibility that it could inspire further suicides.

Paltalk filed a series of patent lawsuits against video game developers claiming they were infringing U.S. patents 5,822,523 and 6,226,686 "Server-group messaging system for interactive applications", patents they purchased from the now-defunct company HearMe in 2002. Paltalk first brought a case against Microsoft in 2006, claiming Halo and Xbox Live violated its patent rights, and later settled out of court.

In 2009, Paltalk then moved on to Sony, Activision Blizzard, NCsoft, Jagex and Turbine, Inc., claiming that these companies are also violating Paltalk's patents whose damages range in the "tens of millions of dollars". In 2010, a US judge dismissed the lawsuit against Jagex and stated "After reviewing source code for the RuneScape video game made available by Jagex, Paltalk and Jagex agree that the RuneScape video game does not infringe the patents-in-suit."

In June 2013, it was revealed that Paltalk was targeted by the National Security Agency's PRISM surveillance program.

== Tinychat ==
In December 2014, online chat website Tinychat was acquired by Paltalk. Paltalk stated that Tinychat would remain a standalone application. Tinychat allowed users to communicate via instant messaging, voice chat, and video chat, and to create their own virtual chat room on any topic. Tinychat ran on HTML5 compatible browsers and standalone apps for Android or iOS. The chat rooms could contain a rolling maximum of 12 video and audio feeds. Tinychat, including all of its services, was owned by PeerStream.

On November 16, 2009, Tinychat launched Tinychat.tv, which offers users the ability to live stream any video or show hosted on Tinychat. The service used Tinychat's API and provides the ability to launch a personalized page and channel for initiating multi-user shows. Tinychat announced that it would not charge for the cost of bandwidth. Based upon restrictions, Tinychat.tv has been closed.

In February 2010, Tinychat launched Tinychat Next, a service similar to Chatroulette. Tinychat Next differed from Chatroulette with the addition of topic-based rooms. In January 2011, Tinychat raised $1.5 million in funding.

On December 16th 2024, an announcement that Tinychat had ended services and closed down appeared on the Tinychat website. The shutdown announcement page featured an advertisement for Paltalk.

On May 2nd 2025, the Tinychat domain name was sold to the owner of StrangerCam, who has since then revived the Tinychat website and is now a random video chat website.

== See also ==
- Comparison of instant messaging clients
- Patent troll
