= OoVoo =

Video chat and messaging app

ooVoo
- Developers: Krush Technologies, LLC
- Release: 2006 Discontinued; November 25, 2017
- Stable release: 3.X / February 2017; 9 years ago
- Operating system: iOS; Android; Mac OS X Microsoft Windows; Windows Phone
- Type: Instant messaging, Videotelephony, Videoconferencing, Voice over IP
- License: Proprietary
- Website: www.oovoo.com

ooVoo was a video chat and messaging app developed by ooVoo LLC and owned by Krush Technologies, LLC. ooVoo had applications for Android, iOS, Mac OS X, Microsoft Windows, Windows Phone, and Facebook. The original Microsoft Windows app was released in 2007. It was discontinued on November 25, 2017.

== Features ==
ooVoo allowed users to communicate through free messaging, voice, and video chat. ooVoo video conferencing technology can have HD video and audio calls with up to twelve participants simultaneously and desktop sharing.

== History ==
ooVoo was co-founded in 2006 by Philippe Schwartz, Eran Kariti, and Ohio entrepreneur Clay Mathile. The platform was built on core video communication technology invented by Kariti during his time at Arel Communications and Software (formerly NASDAQ: ARLCF). Arel was founded in 1982 and specializes in remote e-learning collaboration application software. On March 13, 2006, Arel Communications was taken private by its current owners and relaunched as ooVoo.

In June 2007, ooVoo for Microsoft Windows launched, with a video chat feature. In February 2008, video call recording and phone calling were introduced. In May 2008, ooVoo for Apple's OS X launched, creating cross-platform capabilities for video chat. In February 2009, ooVoo 2.0 launched and featured browser-based video chat rooms and video chat through a web link with no download required. An open API was launched with version 2.0, allowing developers to build customized applications and widgets. In May 2009, ooVoo introduced the first air-to-ground three-way video conversation. ooVoo version 2.2 was launched in July 2009, and introduced business plans geared for multiple seats and desktop sharing. New pay-as-you-go options and international phone calling were also introduced.

In January 2010, ooVoo released its app for Android mobile devices.

On 2 June 2011, ooVoo launched its social video chat service on Apple's iPhone (and other iOS devices), making its free HD Video chat service cross platforms, including: PC, Mac, Android and iPhone.

On July 22, 2013, ooVoo released a Software Development Kit (SDK), allowing other applications to leverage its video chat technology (current apps leveraging the ooVoo SDK: Flinch, Heystax).

On June 10, 2014, ooVoo released its app for Windows Phone devices.

On September 9, 2014, ooVoo released its Video SDK for WebRTC.

On November 25, 2017, ooVoo announced via Twitter that it would be shutting down, citing a lack of profit as the reason.

== Accolades ==
- ooVoo won PC Magazine's Software Innovation "Best in Show" Award at the DigitalLife Expo in September 2007.
- In March 2008, ooVoo won the "Webware 100" award for Communication.
- ooVoo won PC Magazine's Best Mobile Product of 2011 in the Android Category
- ooVoo won the Tabby Award in the Social category for its Android app in August 2013.
- ooVoo was a nominee and finalist for a Mobby Award in the Business Collaboration category for its Android app in September 2015.
- ooVoo was honored in 2016 with a Mobile Excellence Award for Best Social Community.
- ooVoo won the CES Innovation Award Honoree in 2016.
