= Zappacosta (surname) =

Zappacosta is an Italian surname. Notable people with the surname include:

- (Alfredo) Zappacosta (born 1953), Canadian singer
- Davide Zappacosta (born 1992), Italian footballer
- Giacomo Zappacosta (born 1988), Italian midfielder football player
- Pierluigi Zappacosta (born 1950), founder of Logitech
- Marco Zappacosta (born 1985), founder of Thumbtack

== See also ==
- Costa (surname)
