= Logitech G =

American gaming products manufacturer

- Type: Division
- Industry: Esports; Consumer electronics; PC gaming; Computer peripherals
- Founded: 2013
- Key people: Robin Piispanen
- Number of employees: 200 (2018)
- Parent: Logitech
- Website: https://www.logitechg.com/en-us

Logitech G is the dedicated gaming sub-brand of Logitech, launched in 2013. The brand makes gaming peripherals for general consumers and esports athletes.

== History ==
Logitech launched its gaming division, Logitech G, in March 2013. It launched the Logitech G line with four mice, two keyboards, and two pairs of headsets. The line replaced the Logitech logo with a new "G" logo and the Logitech G700s was its flagship mouse.

Bracken Darrell, the former CEO of Logitech, shifted to targeting the competitive esports market in 2016. Logitech G has hosted a series of simulation racing events starting in 2020 with McLaren as the title sponsor for its community circuit challenge. Logitech G and its partners launched an adaptive esports competition in 2021.

The G Cloud handheld game console was announced in 2022; it was the first Logitech G standalone device.

== Operations ==
Logitech G is a brand of Logitech overseen, as of 2023, by CEO Hanneke Faber and, as of 2026, Logitech G's vice president and general manager Robin Piispanen.

Gaming was the second-largest source of revenue for Logitech, after PC peripherals, as of 2017.

Logitech G hosts an annual Logitech G PLAY product showcase. It has partnered with brands including Herman Miller, McLaren, Momo and Genshin Impact. This includes the 2025 McLaren racing collection.

== Products ==
The PRO X3 SUPERSTRIKE in pink.

The G512 X 98 keyboard in white.

Logitech G sells hardware including headsets, keyboards and mice, as well as G Hub software. They are responsible for their proprietary lines of technology, like the LIGHTSPEED wireless program (offering ultra-low professional-grade latency), HERO optical sensors (delivering precise tracking), and LIGHTSYNC RGB customization. The brand has four series including the ASTRO series for console gaming; the PRO series for esports; the Logitech G series for PC gaming; and the Sim Racing series for racing games.

=== Esports ===
Logitech G consults with esports athletes on product designs and includes them in marketing. It had collaborated with more than 400 professional esports players during the development of products. This includes more than 50 professional gamers for the G Pro Wireless Gaming Mouse and with Michael ‘Shroud’ Grzesiek on its gaming mice.

The brand partnered with esports organizations including G2 Esports, BiliBili Gaming, Karmine Corp, DRX, and TSM. It announced a partnership with NASCAR driver Bubba Wallace in 2021.

Logitech G has sponsored esports events such as Logitech G Rivals, a Rainbow Six Siege tournament; the Logitech McLaren G Challenge Grand Finals Summer Season, a Forza Motorsport competition; and a 2020 League of Legends Academy competition.

=== Awards ===
Logitech G won Red Dot Design Awards for the G 810 Orion Spectrum (2017), the G Powerplay (2018) and PRO X TKL (2024).

It won IF Design Awards for its G Prodigy Series (2017). G303 Shroud Edition Gaming Mouse (2023), Pro Racing Wheel and Pedals (2023) and Logitech G Racing Sim (2025).
