= Stanford, California =

Census-designated place in Santa Clara County, California, US

Stanford
- Census-designated place
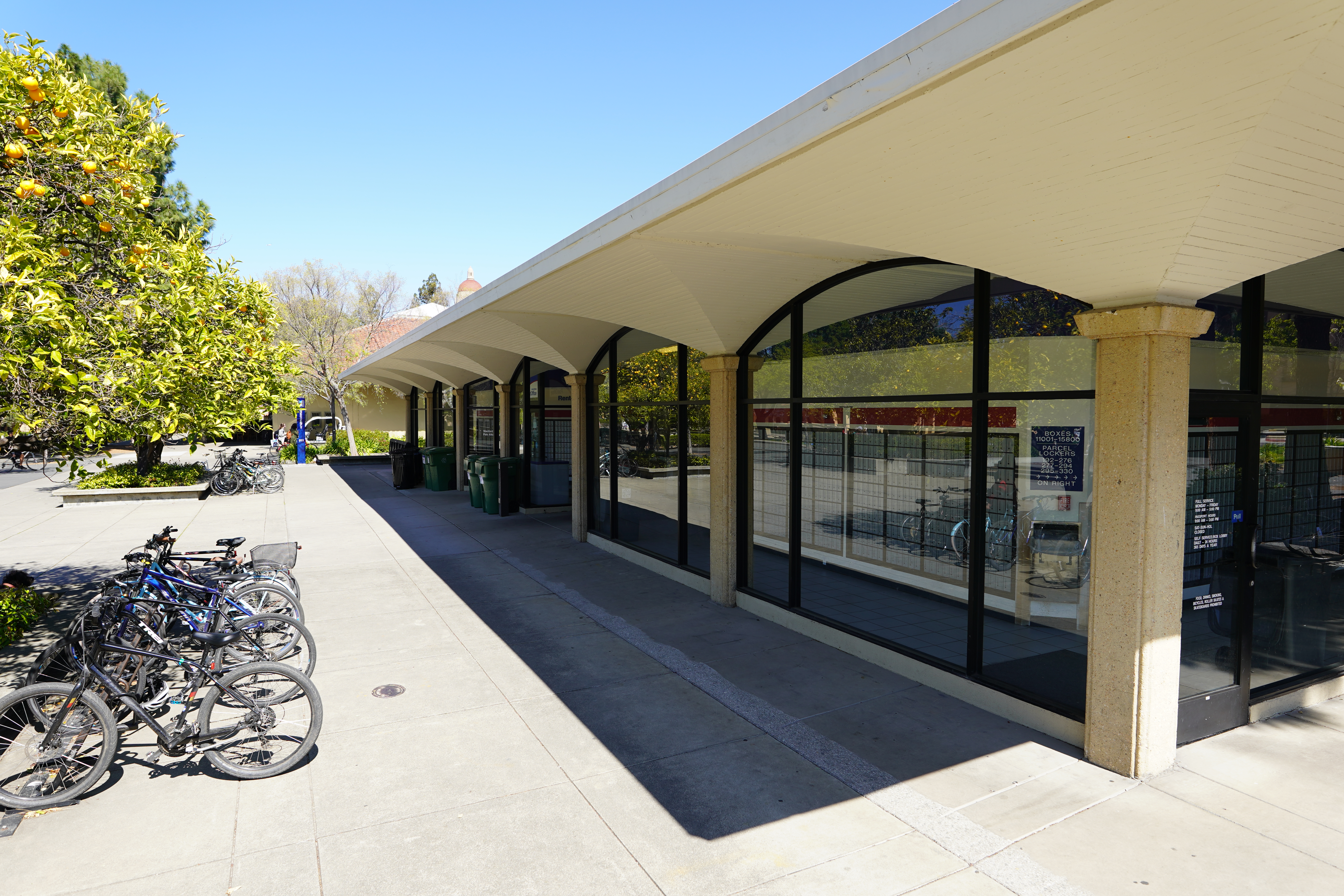
- Stanford post office

- Location in Santa Clara County and the state of California

- Location within San Francisco Bay Area Location within California Location within the United States
- Coordinates: 37°25′21″N 122°9′55″W
- Country: United States
- State: California
- County: Santa Clara

Area
  - Total: 2.796 sq mi (7.241 km^{2})
  - Land: 2.751 sq mi (7.124 km^{2})
  - Water: 0.046 sq mi (0.118 km^{2}) 1.62%
- Elevation: 95 ft (29 m)

Population (2020)
  - Total: 21,150
  - Density: 7,689/sq mi (2,969/km^{2})
- Time zone: UTC−8 (Pacific)
  - Summer (DST): UTC−7 (PDT)
- ZIP Codes: 94305, 94309
- Area code: 650
- FIPS code: 06-73906
- GNIS feature IDs: 1867061, 2409994

Stanford is a census-designated place (CDP) in the northwestern corner of Santa Clara County, California, United States. It is the home of Stanford University, after which it was named. The CDP's population was 21,150 at the 2020 census. Stanford is adjacent to the city of Palo Alto, which borders it to the east, but the CDP itself remains unincorporated.

Most of the Stanford University campus and other core University-owned land is situated within the CDP of Stanford, though the Stanford University Medical Center, the Stanford Shopping Center, and the Stanford Research Park are officially part of the city of Palo Alto. Its resident population consists of the inhabitants of on-campus housing, including graduate student residences and single-family homes and condominiums owned by their faculty inhabitants but located on leased Stanford land.

The adjacent neighborhood of College Terrace, a residential neighborhood with streets named after universities and colleges, is neither part of the Stanford CDP nor owned by the university (except for a few individual houses). Instead, it is part of Palo Alto.

== Geography ==
Stanford is located at 37°25′21″N 122°9′55″W (37.422590, −122.165413).

According to the United States Census Bureau, the CDP has a total area of 2.80 square miles (7.3 km^{2}), of which 2.75 square miles (7.1 km^{2}) is land and 0.045 square miles (0.12 km^{2}) (1.62%) is water.

=== Climate ===
This region experiences warm, dry summers, with no average monthly temperatures above 77.6 °F (25.3 °C), and cool, wet winters, with no average monthly temperatures below 37.7 °F (3.2 °C). According to the Köppen Climate Classification system, Stanford has a warm-summer Mediterranean climate, abbreviated "Csb" on climate maps.

Climate data for Stanford, California
Month	Jan	Feb	Mar	Apr	May	Jun	Jul	Aug	Sep	Oct	Nov	Dec	Year
Record high °F (°C)	71 (22)	79 (26)	84 (29)	91 (33)	97 (36)	102 (39)	105 (41)	100 (38)	103 (39)	95 (35)	84 (29)	75 (24)	105 (41)
Mean daily maximum °F (°C)	55.5 (13.1)	59.8 (15.4)	63.7 (17.6)	67.2 (19.6)	72 (22)	76.1 (24.5)	77.6 (25.3)	76.6 (24.8)	76.7 (24.8)	71.9 (22.2)	64.6 (18.1)	56.8 (13.8)	68.2 (20.1)
Daily mean °F (°C)	46.6 (8.1)	50.2 (10.1)	53.2 (11.8)	56.2 (13.4)	60.1 (15.6)	63.7 (17.6)	65.6 (18.7)	65 (18)	64.1 (17.8)	59.9 (15.5)	53.3 (11.8)	48 (9)	57.2 (14.0)
Mean daily minimum °F (°C)	37.7 (3.2)	40.6 (4.8)	42.7 (5.9)	45.1 (7.3)	48.2 (9.0)	51.3 (10.7)	53.5 (11.9)	53.5 (11.9)	51.5 (10.8)	47.9 (8.8)	42 (6)	39.2 (4.0)	46.1 (7.9)
Record low °F (°C)	20 (−7)	25 (−4)	25 (−4)	31 (−1)	36 (2)	40 (4)	40 (4)	44 (7)	39 (4)	32 (0)	26 (−3)	22 (−6)	20 (−7)
Average rainfall inches (mm)	2.7 (69)	2.7 (69)	2.1 (53)	1.1 (28)	0.5 (13)	0.1 (2.5)	0 (0)	0 (0)	0.1 (2.5)	0.7 (18)	1.6 (41)	3.2 (81)	14.8 (377)
Average rainy days (≥ 0.01 in)	10	10	8	5	3	1	0	0	1	3	6	10	57
Source: Climate Summary for Stanford, California

== Demographics ==
Historical population
Census	Pop.	Note	%±
2000	13,314		—
2010	13,809		3.7%
2020	21,150		53.2%
U.S. Decennial Census

=== 2020 census ===
As of the 2020 census, Stanford had a population of 21,150 and a population density of 7,690.9 inhabitants per square mile (2,969.5/km^{2}). The age distribution was 4.7% under the age of 18, 36.8% aged 18 to 24, 48.5% aged 25 to 44, 6.5% aged 45 to 64, and 3.5% who were 65 years of age or older. The median age was 25.8 years. For every 100 females there were 105.3 males, and for every 100 females age 18 and over there were 105.4 males age 18 and over.

The census reported that 41.0% of the population lived in households, 59.0% lived in non-institutionalized group quarters, and no one was institutionalized.

There were 4,499 households in Stanford, of which 12.9% had children under the age of 18 living in them. Of all households, 27.0% were married-couple households, 35.8% were households with a male householder and no spouse or partner present, 27.8% were households with a female householder and no spouse or partner present, and 9.4% were cohabiting couple households. About 43.0% of all households were made up of individuals and 2.4% had someone living alone who was 65 years of age or older. The average household size was 1.93, and there were 1,471 families (32.7% of households).

There were 4,829 housing units at an average density of 1,756.0 per square mile (678.0/km^{2}), of which 93.2% (4,499) were occupied; 18.2% of occupied units were owner-occupied and 81.8% were occupied by renters. The homeowner vacancy rate was 0.4% and the rental vacancy rate was 5.0%.

100.0% of residents lived in urban areas, while 0.0% lived in rural areas.

Racial composition as of the 2020 census
Race	Number	Percent
White	11,778	55.7%
Black or African American	1,069	5.1%
American Indian and Alaska Native	41	0.2%
Asian	5,209	24.6%
Native Hawaiian and Other Pacific Islander	243	1.1%
Some other race	760	3.6%
Two or more races	2,050	9.7%
Hispanic or Latino (of any race)	2,447	11.6%

=== 2010 census ===
At the 2010 census Stanford had a population of 13,809. The population density was 4,974.5 inhabitants per square mile (1,920.7/km^{2}). The racial makeup of Stanford was 7,932 (57.4%) White, 651 (4.7%) African American, 86 (0.6%) Native American, 3,777 (27.4%) Asian, 28 (0.2%) Pacific Islander, 263 (1.9%) from other races, and 1,072 (7.8%) from two or more races. Hispanic or Latino people of any race were 1,439 persons (10.4%).

The census reported that 55.6% of the population lived in households and 44.4% lived in non-institutionalized group quarters.

There were 3,913 households, 517 (13.2%) had children under the age of 18 living in them, 1,159 (29.6%) were opposite-sex married couples living together, 47 (1.2%) had a female householder with no husband present, 24 (0.6%) had a male householder with no wife present. There were 159 (4.1%) unmarried opposite-sex partnerships, and 15 (0.4%) same-sex married couples or partnerships. 1,522 households (38.9%) were one person and 87 (2.2%) had someone living alone who was 65 or older. The average household size was 1.96. There were 1,230 families (31.4% of households); the average family size was 2.77.

The age distribution was 917 people (6.6%) under the age of 18, 7,914 people (57.3%) aged 18 to 24, 3,595 people (26.0%) aged 25 to 44, 762 people (5.5%) aged 45 to 64, and 621 people (4.5%) who were 65 or older. The median age was 22.6 years. For every 100 females, there were 118.3 males. For every 100 females age 18 and over, there were 120.1 males.

There were 3,999 housing units at an average density of 1,440.6 per square mile, of the occupied units 790 (20.2%) were owner-occupied and 3,123 (79.8%) were rented. The homeowner vacancy rate was 0.9%; the rental vacancy rate was 0.9%. 2,022 people (14.6% of the population) lived in owner-occupied housing units and 5,657 people (41.0%) lived in rental housing units.

=== Income ===
In 2023, the US Census Bureau estimated that the median household income was $70,651, and the per capita income was $42,003. About 7.0% of families and 18.2% of the population were below the poverty line.

== Politics ==
The area is strongly Democratic, with 54% registered with the Democratic Party and 15% registered with the Republican Party.

In the California State Legislature, Stanford is in the 13th senatorial district, represented by Democrat Josh Becker, and in the 23rd Assembly district, represented by Democrat Marc Berman.

In the United States House of Representatives, Stanford is in California's 16th congressional district, represented by Democrat Sam Liccardo.

== Education ==
The Stanford CDP is part of the Palo Alto Unified School District which serves students kindergarten through high school. Two of the district's schools are within the boundaries of the CDP: Escondido Elementary School and Lucille M. Nixon Elementary School.

Preschools in the CDP include the Bing Nursery School, run by the university's School of Humanities and Sciences, and the Children's Center of the Stanford Community, a parent-teacher cooperative.

== Notable people ==
The following are people who were either born or spent a significant part of their childhood living in Stanford, California.

- Sam Bankman-Fried (b. 1992), convicted fraudster and co-founder of FTX
- Persis Drell (b. 1956), physicist and academic administrator
- John Gall (b. 1978), former Major League Baseball outfielder and first baseman, played for the St. Louis Cardinals and the Florida Marlins
- Marco Zappacosta (b. 1985), co-founder and CEO of Thumbtack
- Lily Zhang (b. 1996), table tennis player, competed in the 2012 Summer Olympics in London

== See also ==
- Stanford University
