= Freepulse wireless headphones =

Type of headphones

FreePulse Wireless Headphones
- Connects to: 2 via one of: 3.5 mm Headphone Jack; Bluetooth 2
- Design firm: Logitech
- Manufacturer: Logitech
- Cost: $99.99
- Type: Headphone
- Connection: Bluetooth
- Weight: 60 g

FreePulse Wireless Headphones are wireless headphones that send the audio stream from the receiver to the wireless headphones via Bluetooth. The receiver can use a 3.5 mm headphone jack to plug into most audio outputs. The headphones wirelessly transmit sound for up to 10 metres (33 ft) away from the receiver with Bluetooth 2.0 using Enhanced Data Rate (EDR) technology. It can be paired with a great majority of music players, but can also be paired up with an external Bluetooth source.
