= Zappa (disambiguation) =

Frank Zappa (1940–1993) was an American musician, songwriter, composer, recording engineer, record producer and film director.

Zappa may also refer to:

- Zappa (surname), including a list of people with the name
- Zappa (chess), a computer chess program
- Zappa (1983 film), a Danish film by Bille August
- Zappa (2020 film), a documentary film about Frank Zappa
- Zappa (Guilty Gear), a character from Guilty Gear
- Zappa, a character in Chrono Cross
- Zappa, a group of meerkats in Meerkat Manor

== See also ==
- Pachygnatha zappa, a spider
- Zappa confluentus, the New Guinea slender mudskipper, endemic to New Guinea
- Zappa–Szép product, a way in which a group can be constructed from two subgroups. It is a generalization of the direct and semidirect products
