= Giacomo Marini =

American businessman (born 1951)

- Born: 1951 (age 73–74); Cugnoli, Province of Pescara, Italy
- Education: University of Pisa
- Occupations: Engineer; Company co-founder; Company executive; Venture capitalist
- Known for: Co-founder of Logitech
- Spouse: Ellen Jamason
- Children: 1

Giacomo Marini (Italian pronunciation: [ˈdʒaːkomo maˈriːni]; born 1951 in Cugnoli, Province of Pescara, Italy) is an Italian businessman and engineer who is the founder and managing director at Noventi, an early-stage technology venture capital firm, based in Silicon Valley.

In 1981, Marini co-founded Logitech and remained with the company as a board member until 1992. From 2013 to 2017 he was chairman and CEO of Neato Robotics, a home robot company until its acquisition by Vorwerk.

== Career ==
In 1981, Marini co-founded Logitech (Nasdaq: LOGI) with Daniel Borel and Pierluigi Zappacosta. He was with the company until 1992 as a board member and member of the management team launching Logitech. He served most recently as executive VP, chief operating officer. Earlier, he was executive vice president, engineering and operations; and vice president of engineering.

Prior to Logitech, he held technical and managerial positions with Olivetti and IBM.

From 1993 to 1995 Marini was president and CEO of No Hands Software (later known as Common Ground Software). No Hands Software created one of the first electronic publishing software, in the style of, and competitive to Adobe Acrobat. From 1998 to 1999, Marini served as interim chief executive officer of FutureTel, a digital video encoders company.

Marini is board member of PCTEL and of NextLabs. Previously he was chairman of Velomat from 2012 and 2020 until its acquisition by Sacmi, chairman of Neato Robotics from 2006 to 2018 until its acquisition by Vorwerk, chairman of Teknema, an Internet appliances company, director of Aurora Algae, Bitfone, Minerva Networks, Sygate and Silicon Valley advisor for CDB Web Tech, a venture capital fund of funds.

Marini is a former board member of NIAF, the National Italian American Foundation and a former member of the board of trustees of the University of California, Davis Foundation.

== Personal life ==
He holds a Laurea degree, cum laude, in computer science from the University of Pisa, Italy.

Marini lives in Northern California with his wife, Ellen Jamason, and daughter Serena.
