= UNASA UCT =

- United Nations Association of South Africa University of Cape Town
- Established: 2007
- Headquarters: University of Cape Town
- Location: Cape Town, South Africa
- Members: 500+
- Affiliations: United Nations Associations, WFUNA
- Website: www.unasauct.org.za

The United Nations Association of South Africa University of Cape Town (UNASA UCT) is an official chapter of the United Nations Association of South Africa (UNASA) and affiliated to the World Federation of United Nations Associations. UNASA UCT is a registered political society at the University of Cape Town. The aim of the society is to work in collaboration with various stakeholders in South Africa to promote and support the goals, vision and principles of the UN and its agencies.

== History ==
UNASA UCT was founded in 2007 at the University of Cape Town (UCT) as a society and a flagship chapter of the organisation. Membership has grown steadily over the years and, in 2011, the society had over 250 members. In February 2012, UNASA UCT recruited over 500 members making it one of the largest student societies on campus where it remains one of the most active.

In March 2022, UNASA Chapters at the University of Stellenbosch and the University of Cape Town collaborated in organizing large-scale student protests against the Russian military intervention in Ukraine. The protests became among the largest anti-war demonstrations to take place in South Africa since the 2003. UNASA SU's 2021/2022 Chairperson, Nina Hugo, led the rally while UNASA UCT's 2021/2022 Chairperson, Daniel Hukamdad, opened the peace march with fiery rhetoric in calling for an immediate cessation of hostilities and demanding adherence to international law. The protests were joined by the Ukrainian Association of South Africa and members of the Ukrainian expatriate community.

UNASA UCT launched its own online publication, the UNASA Express, in May 2022. The inaugural issue included a groundbreaking interview with the President of the Supreme Court of Appeal of the Republic of South Africa, Justice Mandisa Maya.

== Vision ==
UNASA UCT is part of a greater movement that works to breach the gap between the UN and the people of the world. It aims to provide a platform for University of Cape Town students to contribute to the achievement of the Sustainable Development Goals of the United Nations. It also seeks to create awareness and facilitate discourse about current and international affairs that shape the future of South Africa. The organization, aiming to inspire a culture of Global citizenship, wishes to use the university space to unite students from across the globe to exchange ideas, perceptions and experiences.

Furthermore, UNASA UCT strongly desires to be proactive in national and international spheres by campaigning for greater youth involvement in the work of the UN.

== List of Chairpersons ==
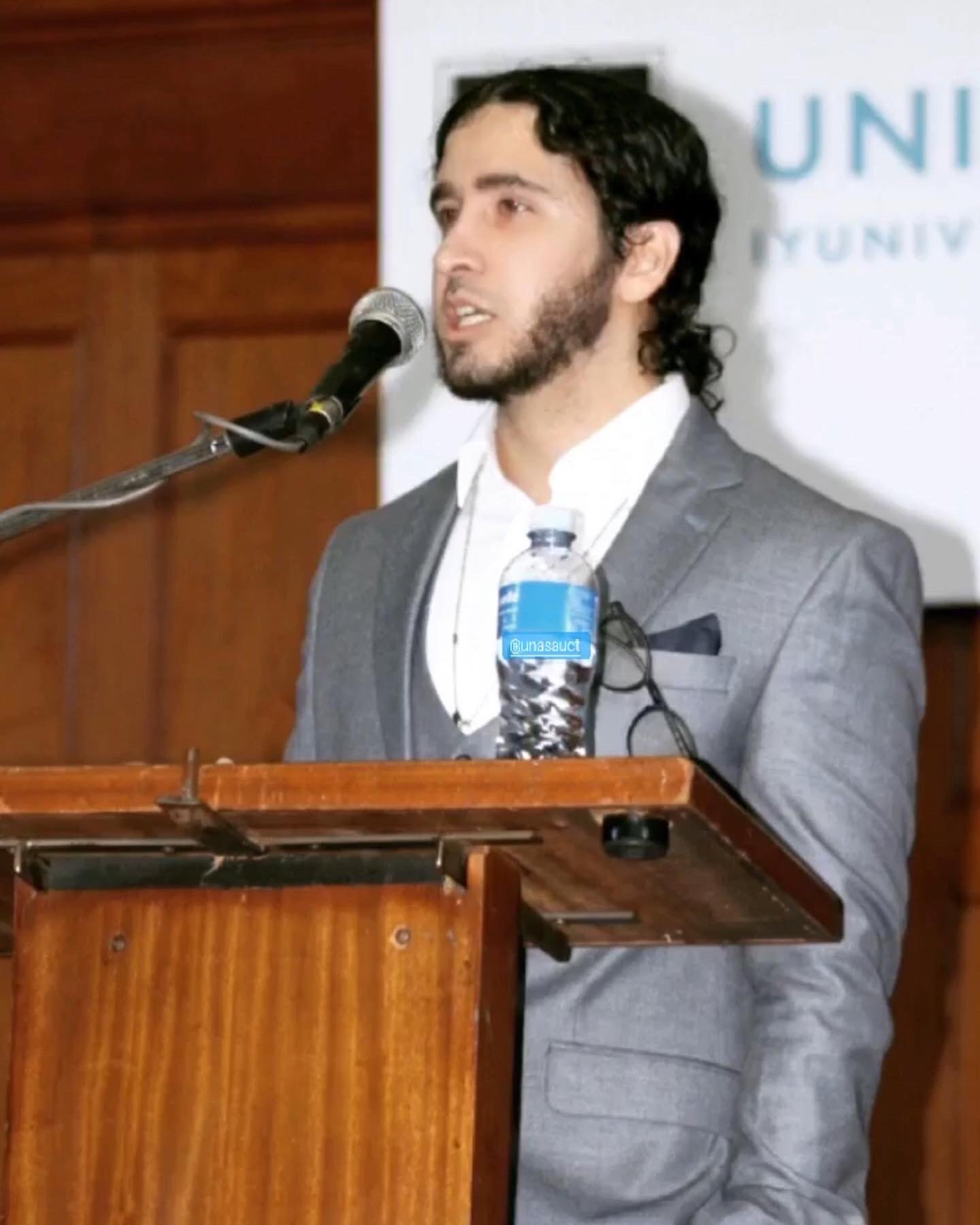
Chairperson Daniel Hukamdad (2021–22) speaking at the Upper Campus in 2022.

- 2007: Thandeka Cochrane
- 2008: Trevor McArthur
- 2009: Cheneal Puljevic
- 2010: Ali Kiyaei
- 2011: Ali Kiyaei
- 2012: Kimeshan Naidoo
- 2013: Darren Brookbanks
- 2020: Brian Kimwatan
- 2021: Daniel Hukamdad
- 2022: Daniel Hukamdad
- 2023: Cheri Morris
- 2024: Khwezi Zwane
- 2025: Nico Wayne Jandre Pampier
- 2026: Benjamin Gukelberger

== Annual events and campaigns ==
=== UCT Model United Nations (MUN) ===
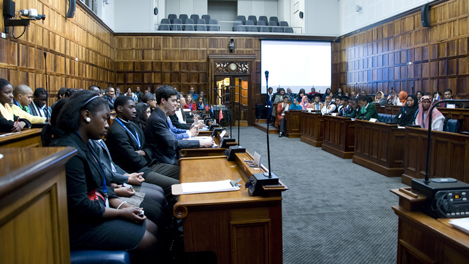
School MUN 2011 conference in progress at Provincial Parliament in Cape Town

UNASA UCT annually hosts its university-level Model United Nations (MUN) conference attracting delegates from all other major UNASA university chapters in the country. Model UN simulations are used as a tool to educate participants about international relations and the 2030 Agenda, while also promoting skills in diplomacy, research, public speaking and debate. The UCT chapter has successfully hosted its MUN conference each year seeing year-on-year growth in both size and participation.

The society's delegates also have the opportunity to participate in the South African Universities Model UN conference hosted at the University of Pretoria by its sibling chapter UNASA UP.

In 2011, an inaugural School Model United Nations was launched by UNASA UCT which brought together 20 high schools in the Cape Town area, exposing pupils to the world of Model UN. This event was hosted at the Western Cape Provincial Parliament in Cape Town. Since then the South African School's Model UN (SASMUN) program has become an annual initiative organised by UNASA National with the support of its chapters in the Western Cape. UNASA UCT also offers its members the opportunity to volunteer as tutors to assist high school teams in preparing for the SASMUN conference.

=== WIMUN ===
In 2017 UNASA UCT sent its very first delegation to the 3rd WFUNA International Model UN (WIMUN) conference hosted at the UN Headquarters in New York. The delegation of 10 UCT students went on to receive the Outstanding Delegation Award in the Africa Group.

=== Blue Week ===
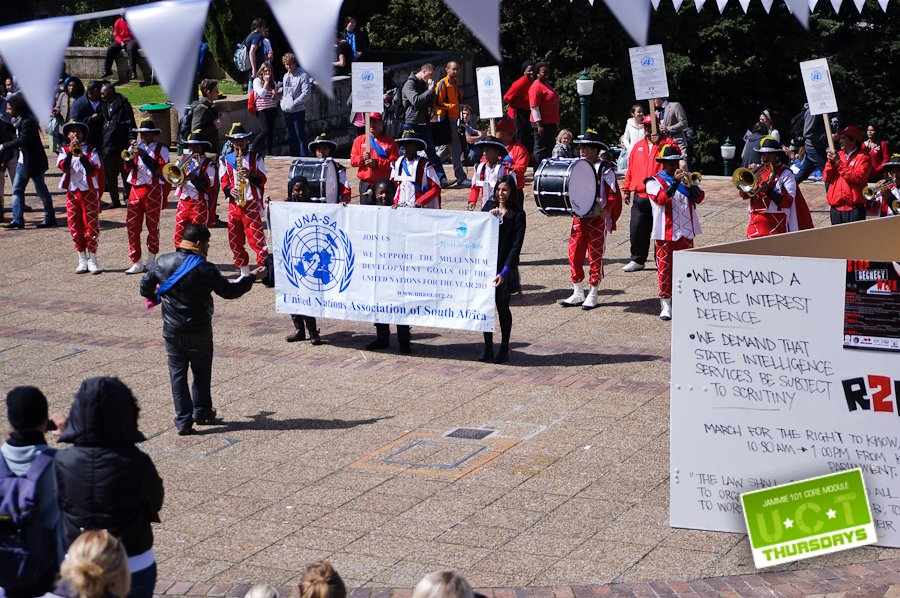
A marching band performs at the University of Cape Town during Blue Week

UNASA UCT hosted its inaugural Blue Week at the University of Cape Town in 2011- a week dedicated to promoting the MDGs and creating awareness to the student body about existing social issues. Blue Week is now an annual event. It exposes UCT students to current issues and discourse that affect the wider community in terms of race, human rights and poverty.

The campaigns and events run during Blue Week include the E-RACE IT campaign, primary Blue Week theme to create awareness on existing racism and issues surrounding racial discrimination; End Poverty Now Campaign, aimed to establish consciousness of ongoing poverty and encourage students to contribute to eradication of poverty; MDGs education day, one day in Blue Week dedicated to creating awareness about the MDGs amongst students; and a Human Rights seminar, a thought provoking discussion of the current trends in human rights.

=== Other annual events ===
UNASA UCT also organizes other events during the year including a pub quiz, tree planting days, UN career talks and movie screenings.

=== Recent Activities ===
In July 2025, UNASA-UCT achieved a significant milestone when four of its members became the first South African youth delegation to participate in the UN High-Level Political Forum on Sustainable Development in several years. The delegation, which included executive chair Nico Pampier, represented South Africa at the UN headquarters in New York, focusing on advancing the 2030 Agenda and Sustainable Development Goals.

== See also ==
- Sustainable Development Goals
- United Nations
- Millennium Development Goals
- University of Cape Town
- Cape Town, South Africa
