= Ben Ferguson =

American talk show host (born 1981)

- Ferguson at the Conservative Political Action Conference, 2025
- Born: Benjamin Grant Ferguson; August 28, 1981 (age 45)
- Education: University of Mississippi (BA)

Benjamin Grant Ferguson (born August 28, 1981) is an American cable television talk show host, radio host, and political commentator. He hosts The Ben Ferguson Show, a nationally syndicated weekend program distributed by Premiere Networks, and The 47 Morning Update, a short daily podcast launched in January 2025 that covers political news with a focus on the Trump administration's policies. He also co-hosts the syndicated weekend program Verdict with Ted Cruz alongside Senator Ted Cruz.

== Early life and education ==
Ben Ferguson was born to Bruce and Karen Ferguson on August 28, 1981. He has an older sister, Holly. Ferguson was homeschooled by his mother in Memphis, TN through the tenth grade. Ben has Scottish ancestry. A local talk-radio host throughout his teens, Ferguson attended Tusculum College, but later, graduated from Westminster Academy. He went on to the University of Mississippi, intending to play tennis; he became a member of Kappa Alpha Order fraternity. He graduated from Ole Miss in 2004. Ben married Anna Bradley Ferguson in March 2010.

== Political activities ==
Ferguson is a member of Students for Saving Social Security (S4). In July 2005, as S4's political director, Ferguson was selected by the White House to join President Bush and Ben Stein for a town hall meeting in an effort to educate the public on the issue of social security reform. Ferguson also spends several weeks a year on the road speaking at youth leadership conferences, high schools and college campuses nationwide. He has become a regular keynote speaker for several groups, including Congressional Youth Leadership and Lead America.

Ferguson is an avid critic of former Memphis Mayor W. W. Herenton. When Herenton resigned and then decided to run again for mayor not two weeks later, Ferguson entered the political scene and pulled a petition to run for mayor. He withdrew from the election when Herenton also withdrew.

== Broadcasting career ==
At 13, Ben Ferguson became the youngest radio talk show host in the country, and the youngest nationally syndicated host at 20. Ferguson published his first book, a political work, “It’s My America Too,” published by William Morris/Harper Collins in 2004 which USA Today named a “top choice read.”

In August 2007, Ferguson joined 600 WREC in Memphis as its morning radio host. He was then moved to the afternoon drive show from 4 to 7 p.m. Central Time. On April 20, 2010, Ferguson resigned from WREC. In a statement he said, "I have left the station, effective today. I’m looking forward to a new market and a new show, in addition to my national show and my continuing appearances on such networks as CNBC, CNN and MSNBC."

Later, it was stated that Ferguson left WREC after an impasse in contract negotiations. It was then announced that Ben Ferguson would take over the 4–7 p.m. Central Time slot on another local radio station, KWAM. Controversial radio host Thaddeus Matthews was fired to make room for Ferguson.

On April 1, 2012, Ferguson became the regular fill-in for Mark Davis on WBAP in Texas, as Davis was involved in contract disputes with the new owners of WBAP, Cumulus Media. When a new contract could not be reached between Mark Davis and Cumulus, Ferguson became the permanent host of the 9–11 a.m. Central Time slot.

Ferguson hosted a local radio show in Memphis during evening drive time slot (from 4 to 7 p.m. Central Time) weekdays on WREC (600 AM) in Memphis until April 20, 2010. On May 3, 2010, KWAM 990 announced that he would be their new evening drive time host. On April 25, 2011, Ben moved to WKIM 98.9 FM, coinciding with a format change in the station to an all-talk network.

In late 2018, Ferguson moved to CRTV, the channel founded by Mark Levin's Conservative Review, to host a midday talk show called The Ferguson File. That December, CRTV merged with Glenn Beck's BlazeTV to form Blaze Media, and the show moved to the combined channel.

In January 2021, Ferguson announced a podcast deal with Premiere Networks that allowed his show to be part of the iHeartRadio podcast network, and subsequently, radio syndication. Premiere Networks added The Ben Ferguson Show, his Sunday night program, to its lineup that month, after the show had been distributed by Ferguson's own Icon Radio Network. The show now airs live on Sundays from 7 to 10 p.m. Eastern Time. The program covers current events from a conservative perspective, with topics ranging from national defense to international affairs.

He also appears frequently on Fox News Channel, MSNBC, CNBC, Fox Business, CNN, and CNN Headline News.

In October 2022, Ferguson became co-host of Verdict with Ted Cruz, a podcast hosted by Senator Ted Cruz, replacing Michael Knowles, who left because of a conflicting arrangement with The Daily Wire. The podcast expanded to three episodes a week after iHeartRadio became its corporate partner. In April 2025, Verdict with Ted Cruz began airing as a 60-minute weekend program syndicated by Premiere Networks to more than 100 news/talk stations.

In January 2025, Premiere Networks launched The 47 Morning Update, a 12 to 15 minute podcast. Episodes air weekdays with a recap on Saturdays, and the program covers the day's political news with a focus on the Trump administration's policies and agenda. It is distributed by iHeartPodcasts.

Ferguson has also served as an American commentator on ITV’s Good Morning Britain.

=== 2004 presidential election ===
At 21, Ferguson addressed a small crowd of young Republicans at the Republican National Youth Convention advocating for youth turnout during the 2004 election. Also during his speech, Ferguson attacked Michael Moore, noted that young people were fighting the war on terror, and made attacks on the media.

== Bibliography ==
- It's My America Too: A Leading Young Conservative Shares His Views on Politics and Other Matters of Importance, 2004, William Morrow (ISBN 0-06-059011-4)
