= Nico Pampier =

South African Youth Delegate to the United Nations and Youth Advocate

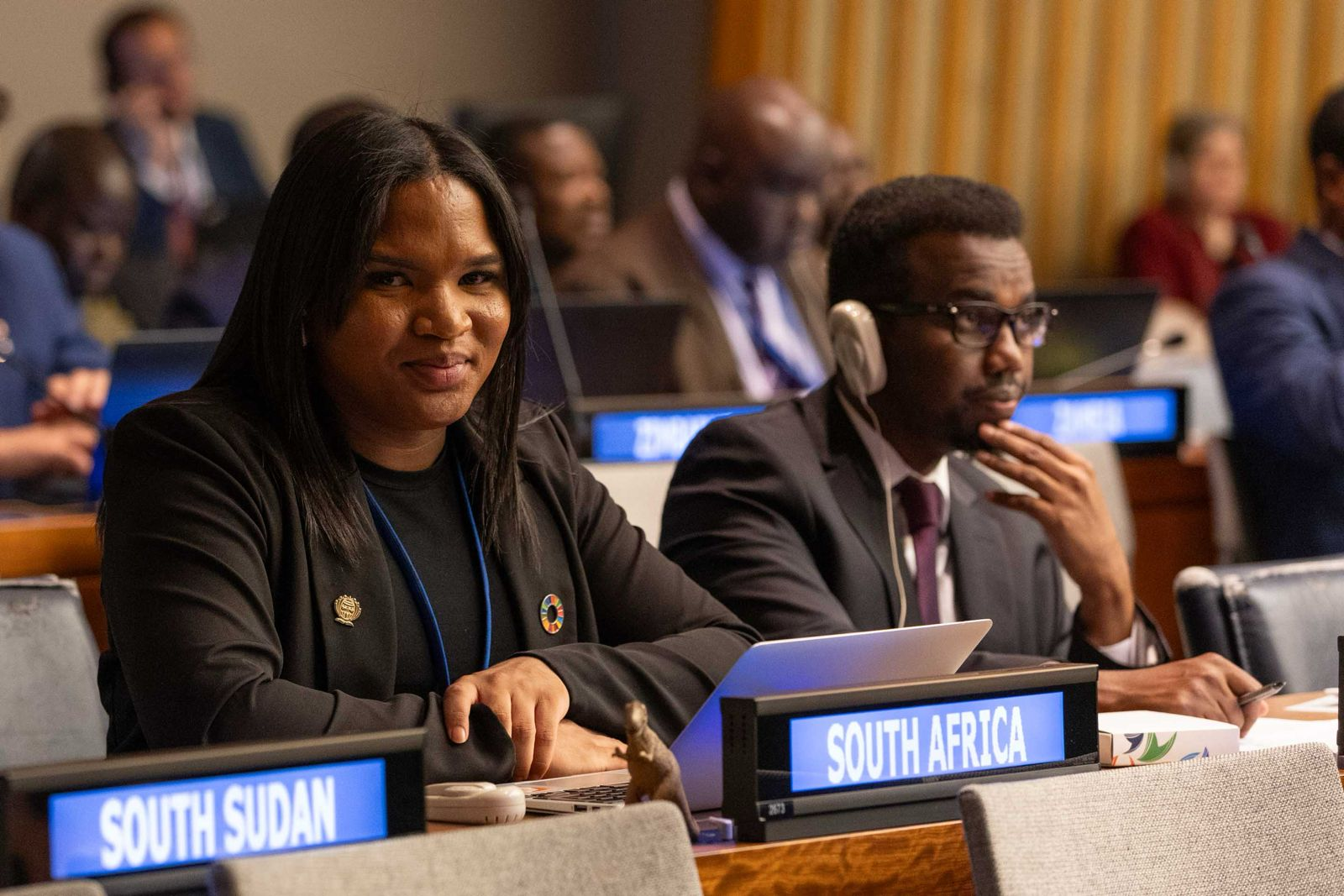
- Nico Pampier UN Youth Delegate

Executive Chairperson of UNASA UCT
- In office 01 November 2024 – 30 October 2025
- Preceded by: Khwezi Zwane
- Succeeded by: Benjamin Gukelberger

Personal details
- Born: Nico Wayne Jandre Pampier; September 3, 1999 (age 27) Velddrif, Western Cape, South Africa
- Education: University of Cape Town
- Occupation: Youth ambassador, student leader
- Known for: Youth participation, refugee rights, sustainable development, education rights
- Awards: UNHCR Young Champion for Refugees (2024)

Nico Wayne Jandre Pampier (born 1999) is the South African Youth Delegate to the United Nations, student leader, and community activist. Born and raised in Velddrif, a coastal fishing town on the West Coast of the Western Cape, Pampier was the first person in their family to attend university. They are known for their work in youth participation, refugee rights, sustainable development, and engagement in international policy spaces, particularly those aligned with the United Nations, UNHCR, and UNESCO.

== Early life and education ==
Pampier was born and raised in Velddrif, a rural fishing community in the Western Cape province of South Africa. The first in their family to pursue higher education, Pampier enrolled at the University of Cape Town (UCT), studying Educational Technology and adult and community education.

== Refugee rights advocacy ==
In 2024, Pampier was named a UNHCR Young Champion for Refugees. In this role, Pampier worked to address barriers faced by displaced youth in accessing higher education, healthcare, and legal documentation in South Africa. Pampier directly assisted asylum seekers in securing documentation to continue their education, including navigating medical requirements and immigration systems.

== Leadership and United Nations engagement ==
Pampier served as Executive Chairperson of the United Nations Association of South Africa (UNASA) chapter at UCT, and as a UN Youth Representative and Global Youth Caucus Representative for the United Nations Major Group for Children and Youth on SDG 16. Pampier also served as a UNESCO focal point on Priority Africa. In July 2025, Pampier was part of a four-member UCT youth delegation that participated in South Africa's official representation at the UN High-Level Political Forum on Sustainable Development' (HLPF) in New York which were the first South African youth group to do so in several years. At the forum, Pampier called for bold action aligned with Agenda 2030 and Agenda 2063.

In February 2026, Pampier spoke at the 4th Annual Post-State of the Nation Address (SONA) High Tea, convened by the United Nations in South Africa and the Desmond and Leah Tutu Legacy Foundation at Tutu House in Cape Town. At the event, Pampier called for a shift from youth participation to genuine youth leadership in policymaking, and welcomed the continued inclusion of LGBTQI+ rights in national policy.

== Recognition ==
- UNHCR Young Champion for Refugees (2024) * Featured in the Mail & Guardian 200 Young South Africans list (2025)
- Named speaker at the UN–Tutu Legacy Foundation Post-SONA High Tea (2026)
- Subject of the News24 Young Mandelas 2025 profile series
- Subject of feature profile in The Voice of Africa (April 2025)

== See also ==
- Youth participation * Sustainable Development Goals * Education for sustainable development * UNASA UCT * UNHCR * UNESCO
