= Pierluigi Zappacosta =

Italian businessman (born 1950)

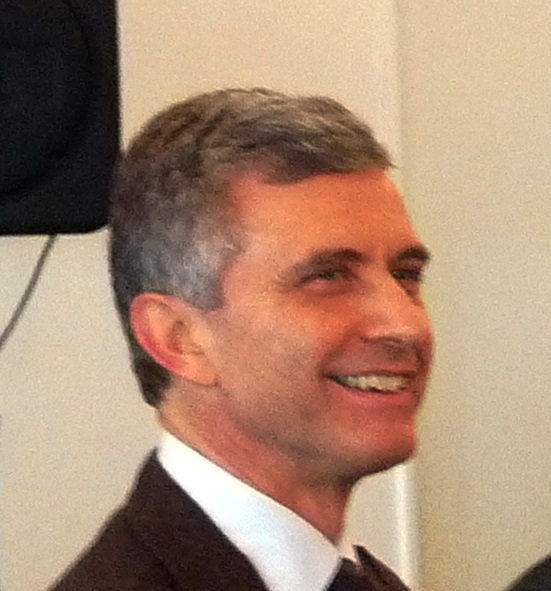
- Zappacosta in 2008
- Born: 2 July 1950 (age 76); Chieti, Italy
- Education: Sapienza University of Rome (BSc.); Stanford University (MSc.)
- Occupations: Businessman, electrical engineer, investor
- Known for: Being one of the three founders of Logitech
- Children: 3, including Marco Zappacosta

Pierluigi Zappacosta (born 2 July 1950) is an Italian businessman, electrical engineer, and investor. He is the chairman of Faro Ventures. He has co-founded, directed, and served on the boards of several prestigious companies, including Logitech and Sierra Sciences.

== Career ==
In 1981, he co-founded the Swiss computer hardware manufacturer and software maker, Logitech (Nasdaq: LOGI) together with Daniel Borel and Giacomo Marini, which went on to become the world's largest manufacturer of computer mice and other personal interface products. Zappacosta served at Logitech for sixteen years, first as president and CEO and later as vice-chairman. He was instrumental in taking the company public in Switzerland in 1988 and on NASDAQ in 1997, raising over $60 million. When he left in 1998, sales of Logitech had grown to over $400 million per year.

Zappacosta is also a venture partner with Noventi, and served as CEO at Sierra Sciences, and chairman at Digital Persona, Inc., a company offering software and hardware for identification based on biometrics. He is a member of the board of trustees of the Reason Foundation and the Bruno Leoni Institute.

== Education ==
He received his bachelor's degree (laurea in electrical engineering) from the University of Rome in Italy, graduating cum laude. He later earned his master's degree in computer science from Stanford in 1978.

== Personal life ==
Zappacosta's son, Marco Zappacosta, is a technology entrepreneur who is known as the co-founder and CEO of the unicorn company Thumbtack.

== Honors ==
On 22 May 2015 the President of the Republic, Sergio Mattarella, appointed him Cavaliere del Lavoro.
