= Daniel Borel =

Swiss businessman (born 1950)

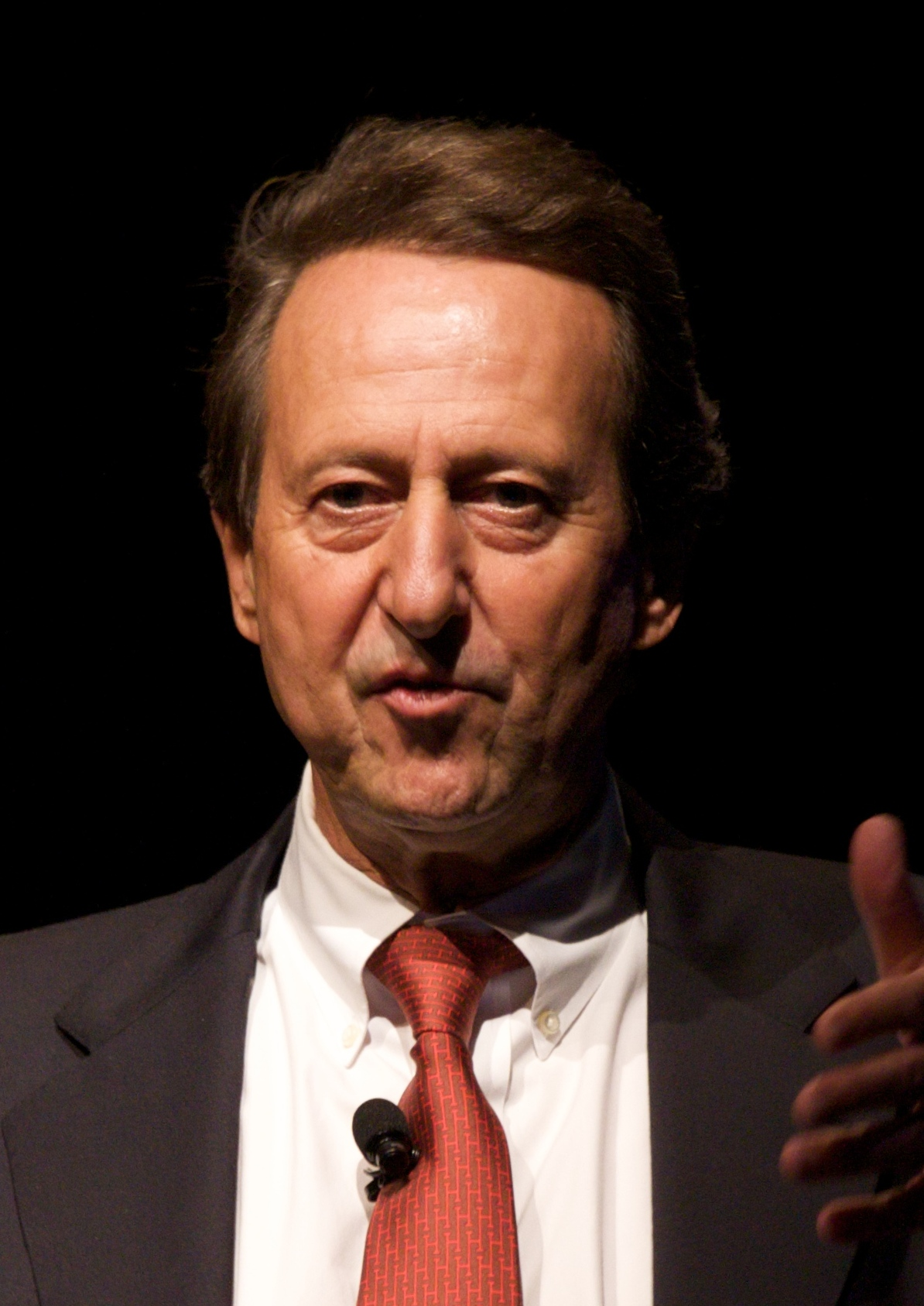
Daniel Borel in 2008

Daniel Borel (born 14 February 1950) is a Swiss businessman and co-founder of technology firm Logitech.

== Education ==
In 1973, Daniel Borel earned an engineering degree in Physics from the École Polytechnique Fédérale de Lausanne in Switzerland, and in 1977 received a Master of Science degree in Computer Science from Stanford University. He returned to Switzerland the same year.

== Business ==
Borel co-founded Logitech at his father-in-law's farm in 1981 with Pierluigi Zappacosta and Giacomo Marini. He served as Logitech's Chairman 1982 to 2008, and served as the company's CEO from 1982 to 1988, and again from 1992 to 1998. In 1988, he took the Logitech Group public on the Swiss stock market, and on the Nasdaq in 1997. He is currently serving as Chairman Emeritus on Logitech's board of directors.

== Other endeavours ==
Borel was a member of the Nestlé Board of Directors from 2004 to 2016. He also serves on the board of Defitech, founded by him and his wife in 2001, a foundation that brings IT technology to disabled people. In addition, he founded and is chairman of swissUP, a foundation dedicated to promoting education in Switzerland.

In September 2010, Borel, a supporter of the collaboration of Logitech and the École Polytechnique Fédérale de Lausanne, opened the Daniel Borel Innovation Center on the campus of the university's "Quartier de l'Innovation".

In 2019, Borel participated in a fundraising campaign for Unibuddy, a London-based peer-to-peer EdTech platform founded in 2016 by Kimeshan Naidoo and Diego Fanara. Unibuddy raised a total of $5 million in its Series A investment round. Since then, Borel has continued to invest in further Unibuddy funding rounds and the company has raised $32 million to date including a $20 million Series B round in 2021.

== Private life ==
Borel is married, has three children and seven grandchildren.

== Awards ==
- 1992: Honorary doctorate from the Swiss Federal Institute of Technology, Lausanne
- 1988: Swiss Entrepreneur of the Year (Branco Weiss award)
- 2008: World Entrepreneurship Forum's Entrepreneur For The World 2008 Award
- 2020: Ernst & Young Master Entrepreneur Of The Year 2020 Switzerland

== Publications ==
- Interview: We've crossed an inflection point – the world will never be the same again. – EY Switzerland – December 17, 2020
- Interview: Physicists in Industry: Daniel Borel, Co-Founder of Logitech International S.A. – Swiss Physical Society – May 2021
- Podcast: How Logitech Defied Expectations – Swisspreneur EP #197 – October 28, 2021
