= Streamlabs =

Live streaming software service

- Formerly: TwitchAlerts
- Industry: Software
- Founders: Tom Maneri; Ali Moiz; Murtaza Hussain
- Products: Streamlabs Desktop; Crossclip; Willow; Melon; Oslo; Streamlabs Charity
- Parent: Logitech
- Website: streamlabs.com

Streamlabs (formerly TwitchAlerts) is a software company headquartered in San Francisco, California. The company was founded in 2014 and distributes a variety of software centered around live streaming and content creation.

== History ==
Streamlabs was founded in 2014 as TwitchAlerts, a fork of OBS Studio with on-screen visual alerts typically used by streamers.

TwitchAlerts had no official affiliation with Twitch, and was later renamed to Streamlabs in 2016. Logitech purchased the company for $89 million on September 26, 2019.

== Products ==
Streamlabs Desktop (formerly Streamlabs OBS) is a free and open-source streaming software that is based on a fork of OBS Studio. Electron is used as the software framework for the user interface. Streamlabs distributes the user's content over platforms such as Twitch, YouTube, and Facebook.

Crossclip is a video converter website that allows users to convert, edit and share live streaming content across multiple platforms.

Willow is a link-in-bio link tool designed to help users increase revenue and make their links more discoverable. It includes a tipping feature and allows users to tip directly on the page.

Melon is a browser-based podcast live streaming platform. Users can broadcast their live streams to Twitch, YouTube, Facebook, LinkedIn, or a custom RTMP destination.

Oslo is a video review and collaboration tool. Users can upload and share projects in the cloud, and Oslo's project management and annotation tools provide ways for teams to receive and review feedback, as well as upload videos to YouTube.

Streamlabs Charity is a free fundraising platform that assists charities in raising funds and connecting with streamers. Excluding standard processing fees, the platform takes no cut from donations, allowing all proceeds to go to charity.

== Criticism ==
On November 16, 2021, Streamlabs released 'Streamlabs Studio', a cloud capture software for the Xbox One, Xbox Series S, and the Xbox Series X. After the release, the streaming service Lightstream accused Streamlabs of plagiarizing their promotional materials. Later that same day, the OBS Studio team claimed in a tweet that Streamlabs used the name "OBS" in their products despite OBS Studio already denying Streamlabs permission to use the name. This gave the false appearance of being in partnership with OBS Studio.

OBS Studio's tweet resulted in Twitch streamers, including Pokimane and Hasan Piker, threatening a boycott of their product if changes were not made. Other companies, such as Elgato and 1UpCoin, released statements on Twitter about Streamlabs copying their products. The company subsequently removed the name "OBS" from their products.

== See also ==
- OBS Studio
- Twitch
