= Zappa (surname) =

Zappa is a surname. It is an occupational name meaning "farmer", from the Italian word for "hoe" (gardening tool).

Notable people with the name include:

- Frank Zappa (1940–1993), an American musician, songwriter, composer, recording engineer, record producer and film director
  - Ahmet Zappa (born 1974), Frank's son
    - Shana Muldoon Zappa (born 1977), American writer and designer of Disney Star Darlings, wife of Ahmet Zappa
  - Diva Zappa (born 1979), Frank's daughter
  - Dweezil Zappa (born 1969), Frank's son
  - Gail Zappa (1945–2015), Frank's wife
  - Moon Zappa (born 1967), Frank's daughter
- Claudio Zappa (born 1997), Italian professional football defender
- Francesco Zappa (1717–1803), Italian composer and cellist of the 18th century
- Gino Zappa (1879–1960), Italian economist
- Gō Zappa (雑破 業, Zappa Gō, born 1970), Japanese author and anime screenwriter
- Guido Zappa (1915–2015), Italian mathematician
- Lenny Zappa (born 1987), Australian professional boxer of Italian descent

== See also ==
- Zappacosta (surname)
- Zappas
