= Students for Saving Social Security =

S4 logo

Students for Saving Social Security, known as S4, was a 501(c)(3) non-profit activist organization based in Washington, D.C., run by students for students pushing for Social Security reform. S4 was founded in March 2005 and proposed changing Social Security laws to permit personal savings accounts. The organization had a network of 300+ college chapters with more than 11,000 members by 2008. It closed in 2009.

S4 believed Social Security was an issue that should be addressed by the Congress. Co-founders Jonathan Swanson and Patrick Wetherille proclaimed:

== Operations ==
Students for Saving Social Security will lead the charge to inform, organize, and mobilize today's college students to engage in the Social Security debate. Through honest, non-partisan debate we hope to represent the interests of young Americans. We want politicians to understand that an entire generation of voters can be won — or lost — on an issue with lasting implications for our future.

Executive Director Jo Jensen, Strategic Communications Director Neha Shah and Development Director Karen Lee were both graduates of Mount Holyoke College. National Director Ryan Lynch attended Emory University and studied at Georgetown University's graduate school.

Three directors of S4, Marco Zappacosta, Jonathan Swanson, Jeremy Tunnell went on to found the online marketplace and unicorn company Thumbtack.
