= Marco Zappacosta =

American entrepreneur

- Born: 1985 (age 40–41); Stanford, California, U.S.
- Education: Columbia University (BA)
- Occupation: Businessman
- Known for: Co-founder and CEO of Thumbtack (website)
- Father: Pierluigi Zappacosta

Marco Zappacosta (born 1985) is an American businessman. He co-founded Thumbtack and serves as the company's CEO.

== Biography ==
Zappacosta was born in Stanford, California, in 1985 and grew up in Atherton, California. His father is Pierluigi Zappacosta, an Italian businessman and electrical engineer who emigrated to the United States in the 1970s and co-founded the Swiss computer hardware manufacturer and software maker Logitech. He is bilingual and speaks Italian. He attended the nearby Saint Joseph's School or SJS through 1999, a feeder elementary school and associate to the historic Preparatory Sacred Heart Schools, Atherton, 1999–2003.

Zappacosta attended Columbia University, graduating in 2007 with a bachelor's degree in political science. During college, Zappacosta was the director of Students for Saving Social Security (S4) in Washington, D.C., a group representing the student voice in the Social Security debate, with more than 10,000 student members in over 300 campus chapters nationwide.

He later came up with the idea of creating an online marketplace matching service providers and their customers. In 2008, he launched Thumbtack with two of his fellow S4 directors Jonathan Swanson and Jeremy Tunnell, as well as Sander Daniels.

In the early years, Zappacosta and his team were scraping Craigslist and built an online directory of verified service providers with their photos, license, and reviews. The idea appealed to angel investor Jason Calacanis, who became the first person to invest in the startup.

Zappacosta led the company to develop and launch an instant matching feature that automates and streamlines the booking process between customers and professionals, a process taking nine years and 25 million requests from Thumbtack's over 1,000 categories of jobs.

As of 2021, Thumbtack has a $3.2 billion valuation and has the highest number of professional listings, followed by Yelp.
