= Logitech G Cloud =

Handheld gaming computer

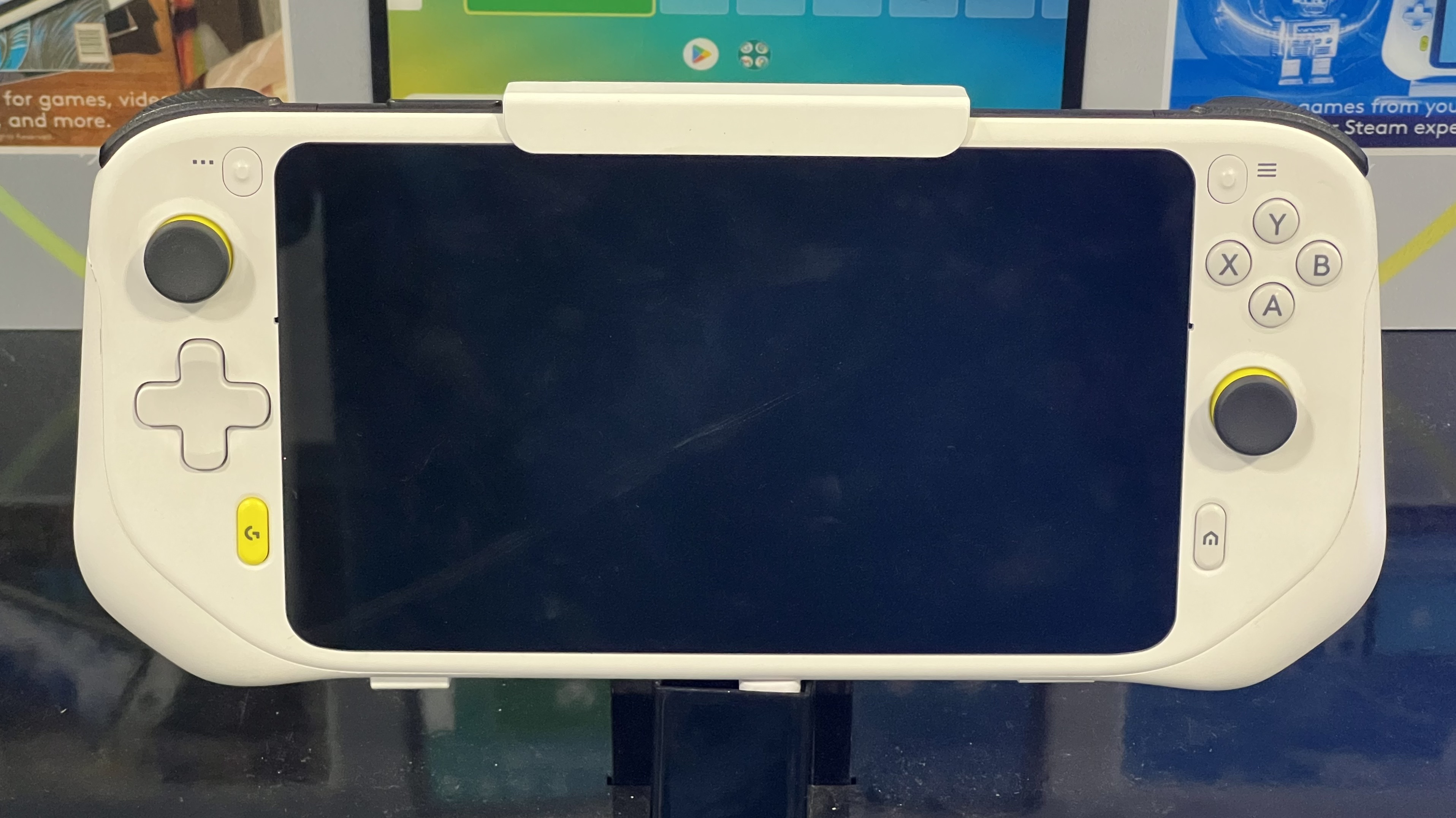
- Developer: Logitech; Tencent Games
- Type: Handheld video game console
- Released: October 17, 2022 (U.S. and Canada); May 2023 (Europe)
- Operating system: Android 11
- CPU: Snapdragon 720G
- Memory: 4 GB
- Display: Horizontal 7-inch touchscreen, 1920x1080

The Logitech G Cloud is a handheld cloud gaming console. It was developed by Logitech in partnership with Tencent Games. It was released in the U.S. and Canada on October 17, 2022, followed by a European release in May 2023.

The G Cloud can stream games through two online services, GeForce Now and Xbox Cloud Gaming, and it also supports local play through Steam Link. It uses Android 11 as its operating system and includes a seven-inch touchscreen. Reviews were critical of the console's $350 launch price and streaming performance issues, although praise was given for its comfortable design.

== History ==
The Logitech G Cloud was released in the United States and Canada on October 17, 2022, two and a half months after it was announced. In Europe, the console debuted in May 2023, and had also been released in Taiwan by that point.

The G Cloud marked Logitech's entry into the video game industry. It was developed in partnership with Tencent Games, which handled software development. The console debuted with a retail price of $350, although preorders were discounted by $50. As of 2024, the sale price had dropped to $299, with some retailers offering an additional discount of up to $40.

== Hardware ==
The Logitech G Cloud uses a Snapdragon 720G processor by Qualcomm. The console has 4 gigabytes of RAM and 64 gigabytes of flash storage; a MicroSD slot allows for expansion of the latter.

The G Cloud weighs 1.02 pounds (463 grams), and is 1.3 inches (33 millimeters) thick. It has a seven-inch touchscreen, which uses IPS technology and has 450 nits of brightness. The screen has a display resolution of 1920x1080, and a refresh rate of 60 Hz. A USB-C port is used for charging the G Cloud's battery, which can last up to 12 hours. The console also has a 3.5mm headphone jack.

The G Cloud has two joysticks and a D-pad, with shoulder and trigger buttons on top. The primary buttons – labeled "A", "B", "X", and "Y" – are arranged with the same layout used on various Xbox console controllers. The "Home" button brings up the console's main menu, while the "G" button can have different effects based on the software being used.

== Software ==
The Logitech G Cloud uses Android 11 as its operating system. The console comes pre-installed with various Google apps which cannot be deleted, including Chrome, Calendar, Contacts, and Maps.

The console emphasizes cloud gaming through two pre-installed online services, GeForce Now and Xbox Cloud Gaming, both used to stream games through the Internet. Another pre-installed service, Steam Link, is used to stream games locally. Android games, downloadable through the Google Play online store, can also be played locally. Video game console emulators can be downloaded through Google Play as well. The G Cloud uses the Wi-Fi 5 standard.

== Reception ==
The G Cloud's $350 launch price was criticized, especially considering the additional features offered by similarly priced devices, including the Steam Deck and Nintendo Switch. (Note: See the following references:) Matthew Adler of IGN wrote that "a limited number of supported cloud services and a steep price for entry make the G Cloud feel more like a proof of concept than a true competitor." The console's reliance on an Internet connection was also criticized; Tabitha Baker of GamesRadar+ noted that "being a cloud-based system means you're wholly dependent upon not just the existence of WiFi wherever you want to play, but also the strength of that connection." Several reviewers encountered problems while streaming games, such as poor video quality and lagging gameplay. In light of the console's price, Cameron Faulkner of The Verge found the hardware weak and the games unenjoyable without an adequate Wi-Fi connection. Will Greenwald of PCMag called it "a bit misguided, underpowered, and overpriced."

CNET's Lori Grunin attributed the visual issues and freezing to the console's use of the older WI-Fi 5 standard. Adler noted that Wi-Fi 6 was not yet common among most home networks, which would need to be updated for G Cloud users "to really see any benefit." He went on to write that the console was "designed for a future we're not quite ready for in terms of infrastructure and accessibility." Likewise, Zachary Boddy of Windows Central wrote that the G Cloud "wants to deliver a vision of the future that, unfortunately, doesn't quite seem to be here yet." Ian Carlos Campbell of Inverse wrote, "Despite the dramatic improvements to game streaming since the days of OnLive, the technology is not ready for mainstream use. The state of American broadband is not ready for it either." Because of this and the high retail price, Campbell believed the G Cloud would remain "the most niche of niche products". Aleksha McLoughlin of TechRadar wrote, "It's built for a very particular niche that I don't think exists; an audience that wants less functionality than what the best tablets can offer to stream content from the best games consoles on the market."

The G Cloud was generally found to perform better when playing games locally, (Note: See the following references:) although Faulkner did encounter visual problems with Android games as well. Brad Bourque of Wired advised consumers to avoid the console: "It struggles more than other devices I've tested at streaming games, and its ability to run games locally via Android is similarly not very robust." Boddy found the G Cloud ideal for game emulation. Jennifer Young, another Windows Central writer, was won over by the console despite her initial skepticism, deeming it to be worth the price.

The G Cloud was praised for its comfortable design, with many critics finding it superior to the Switch in this regard. (Note: See the following references:) According to Adler, the console "feels rigid and well-built" despite being made primarily of plastic. Praise was also offered for the G Cloud's long battery life. (Note: See the following references:) Baker found the screen to be the console's best feature, despite some "noticeable fuzziness" when streaming games. Greenwald considered the screen bright, colorful, and "significantly sharper" than those used on the Steam Deck and Nintendo Switch.

Some criticized the presence of Google apps that cannot be deleted. Campbell wrote that the console "never feels like it gets loud enough, and there's not a lot of dynamic range in what you do hear. Sound just comes out flat."

In 2025, Jordan McMahon of the magazine New York ranked it as the best handheld console for cloud gaming.
