= Jaybird (company) =

Consumer electronics company

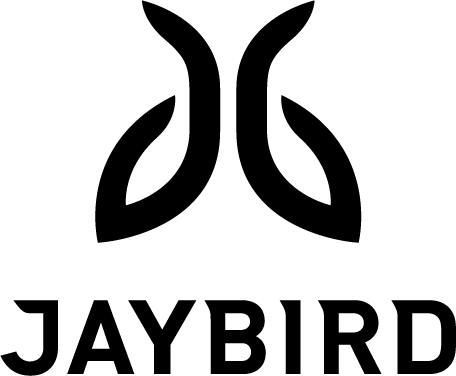
- Type: Subsidiary
- Industry: Audio, Consumer electronics
- Founded: 2006
- Founder: Judd Armstrong
- Headquarters: Salt Lake City, Utah
- Products: Headphones, wearable activity trackers
- Owner: Logitech (2016–present)
- Website: www.jaybirdsport.com

Jaybird was a Utah-based consumer electronics company owned by Logitech. The company designs and manufactures headphones and wearable activity trackers. The company is mainly known for its line of wireless Bluetooth sports headsets. Jaybird was founded in 2006 by Australian entrepreneur Judd Armstrong.

== Company history ==
Jaybird was founded by Australian entrepreneur Judd Armstrong in 2006. Armstrong was disappointed with the performance of headphones available at the time, and wanted to create a product for himself that would be sweat-resistant and non-restrictive for physical activity. Armstrong placed a few of his prototype products online for sale to recoup production cost. After receiving positive feedback from the public, he founded JayBirdGear LLC in Salt Lake City, Utah, in 2006.

The company's first Bluetooth headset, the JB100 Freedom, was launched in late 2007. In 2014, the company was listed for the first time amongst the 5 top-selling premium headphones along with Beats, Bose, Sennheiser, and Sony, according to market research company NPD Group.

On April 12, 2016, Logitech acquired the company for $50 million.

In Oct, 2018, Jaybird released neck-hanging 14-Hour Battery Tarah Pro.

In August 2019, Jaybird released the first generation of Vista wireless Bluetooth earbuds. In June 2021, Jaybird released the next iteration, Vista 2.

== Reception ==
The company's X2 headset model released in 2015 has been included in Best Headphones lists by technology and gadget publishers such as Engadget, TechCrunch, and PC Magazine. Tim Gideon, writing for PC Magazine, rated the headset 4 out of 5 stars, and praised it for its "high quality audio performance," and for being "ideal for athletes who need a very secure fit for intense training." Jeff Dunn from Business Insider included the X2 in his list of "best headphones for working out." Dunn commented, "For the best sound from an exercise-oriented headphone that isn’t outrageously overpriced, go with the Jaybird X2." Dunn warned that finding the best fit for each individual user could take time as the headset is shipped with equipment for the user to configure to their ear size.
