= Cugnoli =

- Comune
- Comune di Cugnoli
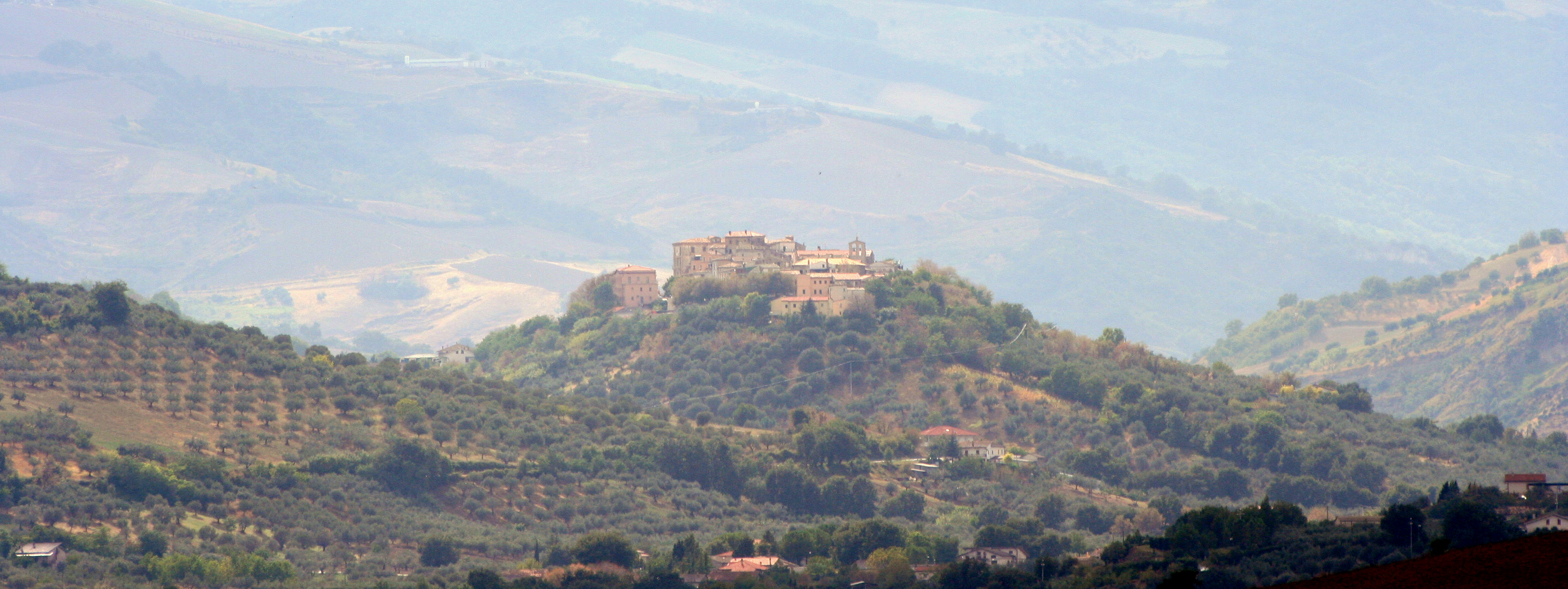
- View of Cugnoli

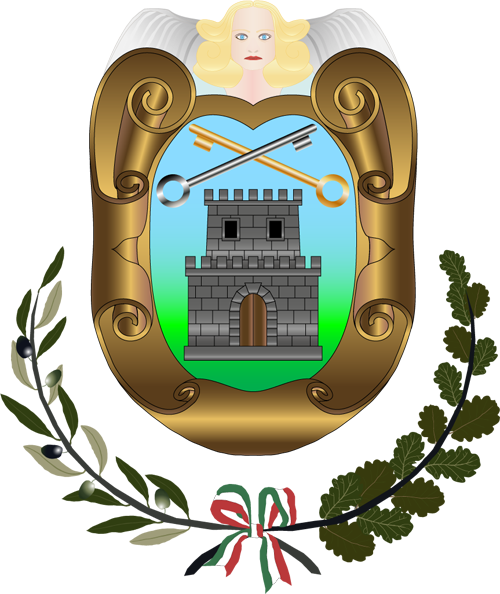
- Coat of arms

- Location within Italy Location within Abruzzo
- Coordinates: 42°18′N 13°56′E
- Country: Italy
- Region: Abruzzo
- Province: Pescara (PE)
- Frazioni: Andragona, Arcitelli, Cesura, Colle delle Bocache (Biancospino), Colle della Torre, Colle San Luca, Colle Santa Lucia, Fonte Tudico, Piano Cautolo, Piano Finocchio, Rotaggiannelli, San Pietro, Santa Maria del Ponte, Vaccardo, Vadallone, Vallarno

Government
  - Mayor: Lanfranco Chiola

Area
  - Total: 15 km^{2} (5.8 sq mi)
- Elevation: 331 m (1,086 ft)

Population (1 January 2007)
  - Total: 1,631
  - Density: 110/km^{2} (280/sq mi)
- Time zone: UTC+1 (CET)
  - Summer (DST): UTC+2 (CEST)
- Postal code: 65020
- Dialing code: 085
- Patron saint: St. Stephen
- Saint day: 19 September

Cugnoli (Abruzzese: Cùnnele) is a comune and town in the province of Pescara, in the Abruzzo region of southern Italy.

The village existence is first recorded in the 12th century, and the medieval walls surrounding the original settlement can still be seen.
