= Unibuddy =

Student engagement platform

Unibuddy Limited
- Company type: Private
- Industry: Education technology
- Founded: 2015
- Founder: Kimeshan Naidoo, Diego Fanara
- Headquarters: London, United Kingdom
- Products: Chat; Discover; Events; Community; Assistant
- Revenue: £5,432,000 (2022)
- Number of employees: 50-100
- Subsidiaries: Unibuddy India Private Limited
- Website: unibuddy.com

Unibuddy is an EdTech company that provides a student engagement platform for higher education institutions. The platform allows prospective and current students to connect with student ambassadors and alumni from the same or similar courses, providing a peer-to-peer support network enabling prospective students to learn about life at a particular university, including course information, accommodation, and student life. Unibuddy was founded in 2015 by Kimeshan Naidoo and Diego Fanara in London, United Kingdom.

== Products ==
Unibuddy's main product is Chat, a student engagement platform that enables higher education institutions to connect prospective students, often in high school, with student ambassadors and alumni. The platform includes features such as one-to-one messaging, group chat, and video calling, as well as a range of tools for student ambassadors to manage their interactions with prospective students. In 2022, Unibuddy launched Community, a product to help higher education institutions create belonging and to help students connect with each other over common interests in groups.

== Partnerships ==
Unibuddy has partnerships with over 600 higher education institutions around the world, including the University of Cambridge, NYU, Imperial College London and Arizona State University. In addition, Unibuddy has a partnership with UCAS (University and Colleges Admissions Service), the organisation responsible for managing applications to higher education institutions in the UK. Through this partnership, Unibuddy provides its platform to UCAS to help prospective students connect with current university students and alumni as they make their decisions on where to apply to university. This partnership allows UCAS to offer a more personalised and comprehensive service to its users, helping them make informed decisions about their education.

== Funding ==
Unibuddy has raised a total of $32 million in funding from investors including Stride VC, Highland VC and Daniel Borel. In 2019, the company raised a $5 million Series A funding round, and additional $5 million Series A round in Q1 2021 which was finally followed by a $20 million Series B funding round later in 2021.
