= Logitech =

Swiss multinational electronics and technology company

Logitech International S.A.

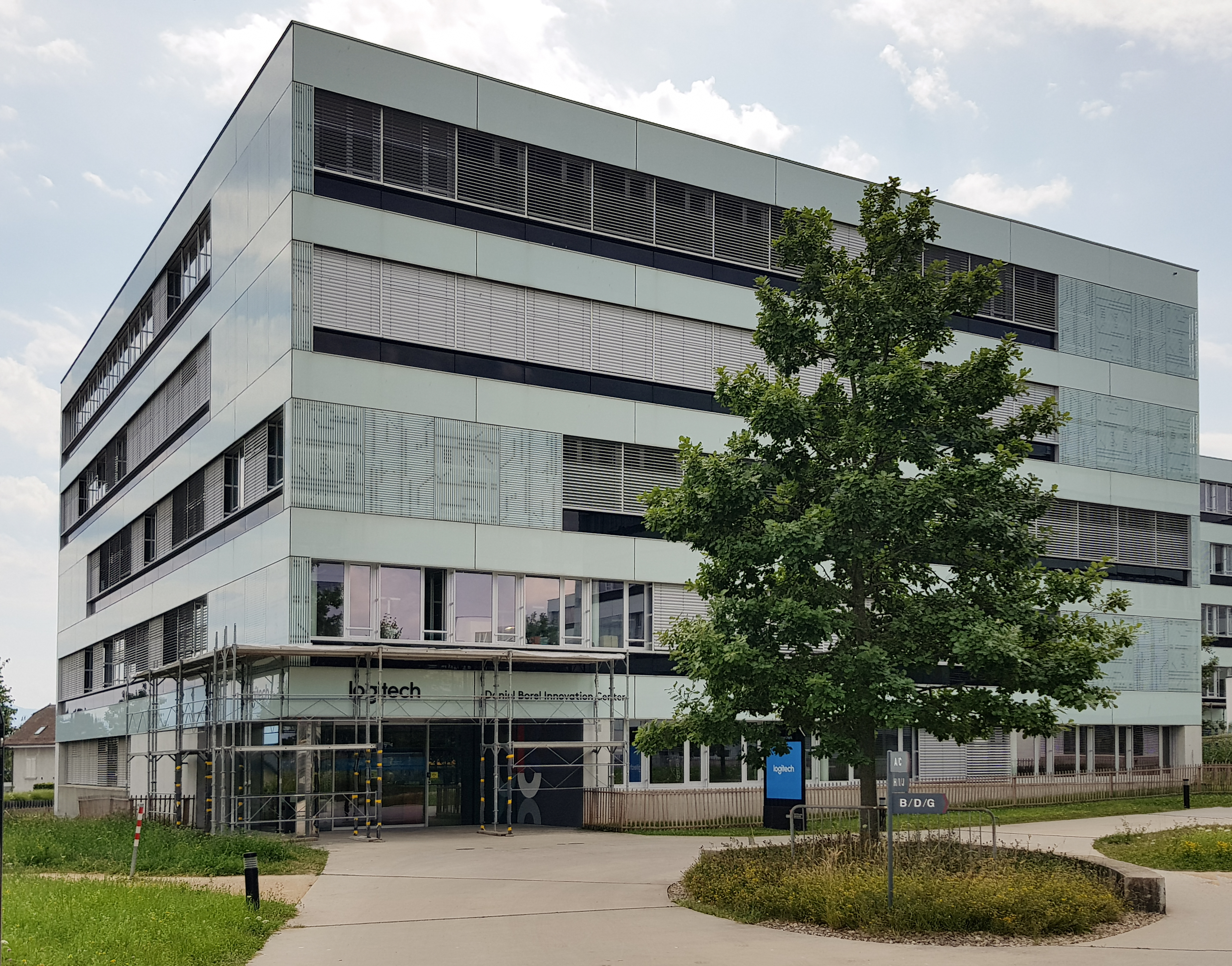
- Headquarters at the EPFL Innovation Park in Lausanne, Switzerland
- Type: Public
- Traded as: SIX: LOGN; Nasdaq: LOGI; Swiss Market Index component
- Industry: Electronics; Technology
- Founded: 2 October 1981; 45 years ago in Apples, Vaud, Switzerland
- Founders: Daniel Borel; Pierluigi Zappacosta; Giacomo Marini
- Headquarters: Lausanne, Switzerland (global headquarters); San Jose, California (United States headquarters)
- Area served: Worldwide
- Key people: Guy Gecht (chairman); Hanneke Faber (CEO); Matteo Anversa (CFO)
- Products: Peripherals; Software; Audio equipment
- Brands: Logitech/Logicool/Logi; Logitech G; Astro Gaming; Blue Microphones; Jaybird; Ultimate Ears; Streamlabs
- Revenue: ▲US$4.55 billion (2025)
- Operating income: ▲US$654 million (2025)
- Net income: ▲US$631 million (2025)
- Total assets: ▼US$3.54 billion (2025)
- Total equity: ▼US$2.13 billion (2025)
- Number of employees: c. 7,300 (2025)
- Subsidiaries: 3Dconnexion; Mirial s.u.r.l.; SightSpeed
- Website: www.logitech.com
- Footnotes; Financials as of 31 March 2025

Logitech International S.A. (/ˈlɒdʒɪtɛk/ LOJ-i-tek) is a Swiss multinational manufacturer of computer peripherals and software. Headquartered in Lausanne, Switzerland, the company is described as Swiss-American due to its operations in the United States, and it has offices throughout Europe, Asia, Oceania, and the Americas. It is a component of the Swiss Market Index, and is listed on the Nasdaq.

The company develops and markets personal peripherals for PC navigation, video communication and collaboration, music and smart homes. This includes products like keyboards, mice, tablet accessories, headphones and headsets, webcams, Bluetooth speakers, universal remotes and more. Its name is derived from logiciel (the French word for software) and "tech".

== History ==
Logo used from 1981 to 1985

Logo used from 1985 to 1988

Logo used from 1989 to 1997

Logo used from 1997 to 2015

Logitech trades as Logicool (ロジクール) in Japan.

Logitech was founded in Apples, Vaud, Switzerland, in 1981, by Daniel "Bobo" Borel, Pierluigi Zappacosta, and former Olivetti engineer Giacomo Marini. Swiss-born Borel and Italian-born Zappacosta had met in California while taking electrical engineering classes in the late 1970s at Stanford University, under professors such as Ethernet inventor Robert Metcalfe. Returning to Europe, they began working on new ideas near Romanel-sur-Morges, Switzerland, and they brought in the Italian engineer Marini to round out the new company. Borel served as chairman of the board, focused on sales and manufacturing, and he was chief executive officer (CEO) for most of the 1990s. Zappacosta served as president and a period as CEO, and he oversaw research. He left Logitech in 1997 to lead Digital Persona, a biometrics company.

The company founders first concentrated on creating word processing software for a large Swiss company, but the company canceled the project. Next, they turned to the computer mouse as an essential component of the graphical user interface used by a workstation requested by the Japanese company Ricoh. Logitech's first mouse, the P4 model, was produced in 1982 in Switzerland, based on an opto-mechanical design by Swiss inventor Jean-Daniel Nicoud working at the École Polytechnique Fédérale de Lausanne (Federal Institute of Technology in Lausanne). The company also published a version of Modula-2 for the IBM PC.

One of Logitech's offices was at 165 University Avenue, Palo Alto, California, US, home to a number of noted technology startups in the birthplace of Silicon Valley. In 1984, Logitech won a contract to supply Hewlett-Packard with computer mice in the role of original equipment manufacturer (OEM). The mice that Logitech supplied to HP were made in a new factory in Fremont, California, and they were branded HP: they did not display the Logitech name. In the early-to-mid-1980s, Logitech stopped making mice in Switzerland, instead opening factories in Cork, Ireland, and Hsinchu, Taiwan, in addition to the Fremont location.

Logitech created the first wireless mouse in 1984, using infrared (IR) light to connect to the Metaphor Computer Systems workstation developed by David Liddle and Donald Massaro, former Xerox PARC engineers. The Metaphor's keyboard was also IR wireless. The consumer IR connection scheme required a clear line of sight for data transfer, and did not work well on a cluttered desk. The wireless mouse did not gain widespread adoption until 1991 when Logitech introduced the first mouse based on a radio frequency connection, not limited to line-of-sight.

In 1985, Swiss inventor René Sommer developed microprocessor circuitry for the wired mouse, making it more responsive to human movement. Logitech incorporated a Sommer-style CMOS microprocessor in its first retail mouse product, the rectangular three-button serial C7 product released in 1985, selling for $99 (equivalent to $296 in 2025). The next wired mouse model, the S9 released in 1989, was curved to fit the human hand, and it carried the Logitech logo for the first time.

In 1988, Logitech incorporated as Logitech International SA with an initial public offering (IPO) on the Zürich stock exchange. In 1989, Logitech produced its first trackball product, the TrackMan. Also in 1989, the company was nominated for PC Mag's Technical Excellence Award for the patented development tool Multiscope Debugger. The application was written for OS/2, followed by versions for the DOS and Windows 3.0 operating systems. Logitech won the award in January 1990.

Logitech re-organized its manufacturing in 1994, shutting down Fremont operations and opening a major facility in Suzhou, China. The Cork, Ireland, location downsized to become an R&D center, and the Hsinchu, Taiwan, factory was kept only for test runs and prototypes. Logitech bought the Connectix webcam division in 1998 for $25 million, then released QuickCam, the first webcam with an integrated microphone. By the year 2000, Logitech was the leader in global sales of webcams, with about four million units sold.

In December 2008, the company announced it had produced its one-billionth computer mouse since beginning production in 1985.

In January 2013, Bracken Darrell became Logitech's chief executive officer; then-CEO Guerrino De Luca continued as Logitech's chairman of the board.

On 25 March 2017, Logitech signed a multi-year sponsorship deal with McLaren as the Official Technology Peripherals Partner. The deal would later be extended to McLaren's eSports endeavours under the Logitech G brand in 2020.

On 29 July 2021, Logitech, in collaboration with choreographer JaQuel Knight, introduced its #Creators4BIPOC initiative under the Logitech For Creators brand. It allows social media creators, particularly BIPOC influencers, to copyright and monetize their online creations by making it possible for choreographers who amplify attention to hits by major artists in the entertainment business to secure copyright of their choreography using Labanotation and earn royalties from it.

In June 2023, Bracken Darrell (former CEO) left Logitech and board member Guy Gecht took over as interim CEO.

On 30 October 2023, Logitech announced that Hanneke Faber would be taking over as the new CEO beginning December 1, 2023. Faber was previously group president at Unilever.

== Acquisitions ==
In 2001, Logitech acquired Labtec for $150 million in order to expand its range of computer peripherals.

In 2007, Logitech licensed Hillcrest Labs' Freespace motion control technology to produce the MX Air Mouse, which allows a user to use natural gestures to control a PC.

In August 2010, Logitech acquired Ultimate Ears, supplier of custom in-ear monitors for professional musicians and Bluetooth speakers for the consumer market.

The company acquired video conferencing equipment maker Lifesize Communications in December 2009. In January 2016, Logitech spun off Lifesize.

Mirial, a mobile visual communications provider, was acquired in July 2011.

On 12 April 2016, Logitech announced that it had agreed to acquire Jaybird, a leader in wireless audio wearables for sports and active lifestyles, for US$50 million, with an additional earnout of up to US$45 million based on achievement of growth targets.

On 15 September 2016, Logitech announced that it had purchased the Saitek brand and assets from Mad Catz for US$13 million. In August 2017, Astro Gaming, makers of professional gaming equipment (mainly headsets), was purchased for US$85 million.

Beyond Entertainment, an esports live broadcasting and digital media business, was purchased for an undisclosed amount in May 2018. In July of that year, On 30 July 2018, Logitech announced that it had purchased Blue Microphones for US$117 million.

On 26 September 2019, Logitech acquired Streamlabs, producer of software and tools for live-streaming, for approximately $89 million.

Logitech announced in July 2023 the acquisition of streaming controller maker Loupedeck for an undisclosed sum.

== Controversies ==
In April 2016, Logitech agreed to pay a $7.5 million penalty following allegations that the company and certain former executives improperly inflated its financial results for the 2011 fiscal year to meet earnings guidance, along with other accounting violations. The U.S. Securities and Exchange Commission stated that these accounting irregularities misrepresented the Swiss company's financial position, depriving investors of an accurate assessment of its performance.

On March 27, 2026, the Douyin account of Logitech China's official store posted a product promotional video for its mouse with the caption "When you say, 'I won't spend another penny,' I lower the price, and yet you still come running like a dog." The video was widely criticized for belittling and insulting consumers, triggering intense outrage online. That night, Logitech China issued an apology on its official Weibo account.

However, in November 2026, Logitech released another video on Douyin that was again accused of likening consumers to "dogs", sparking another wave of public outcry.

== Production ==
The first Logitech mice, starting from the P4, were made in Le Lieu, in the Swiss Canton of Vaud by Dubois Dépraz SA.

Production facilities were then established in the United States, Taiwan, Hungary and Ireland before being moved to Suzhou, China. As of 2005, the manufacturing operations in China produce approximately half of Logitech's products. The remaining production is outsourced to contract manufacturers and original design manufacturers in Asia.

== Gallery ==
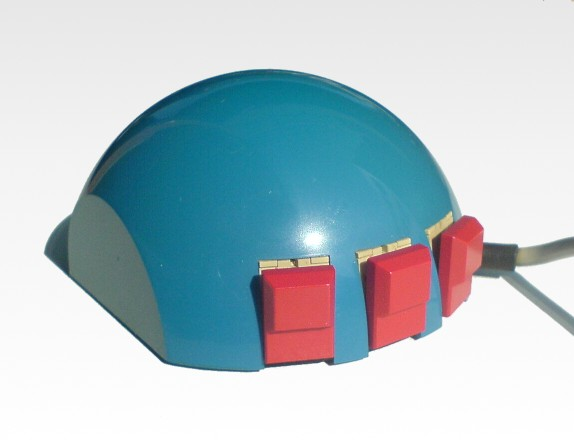
The Logitech Mouse, later renamed the P4, designed by Jean-Daniel Nicoud and André Guignard. First sold in 1982, this was Logitech's first computer mouse and one of the first commercially available mice sold. This particular model of Logitech Mouse was sold with the Smaky microcomputer.

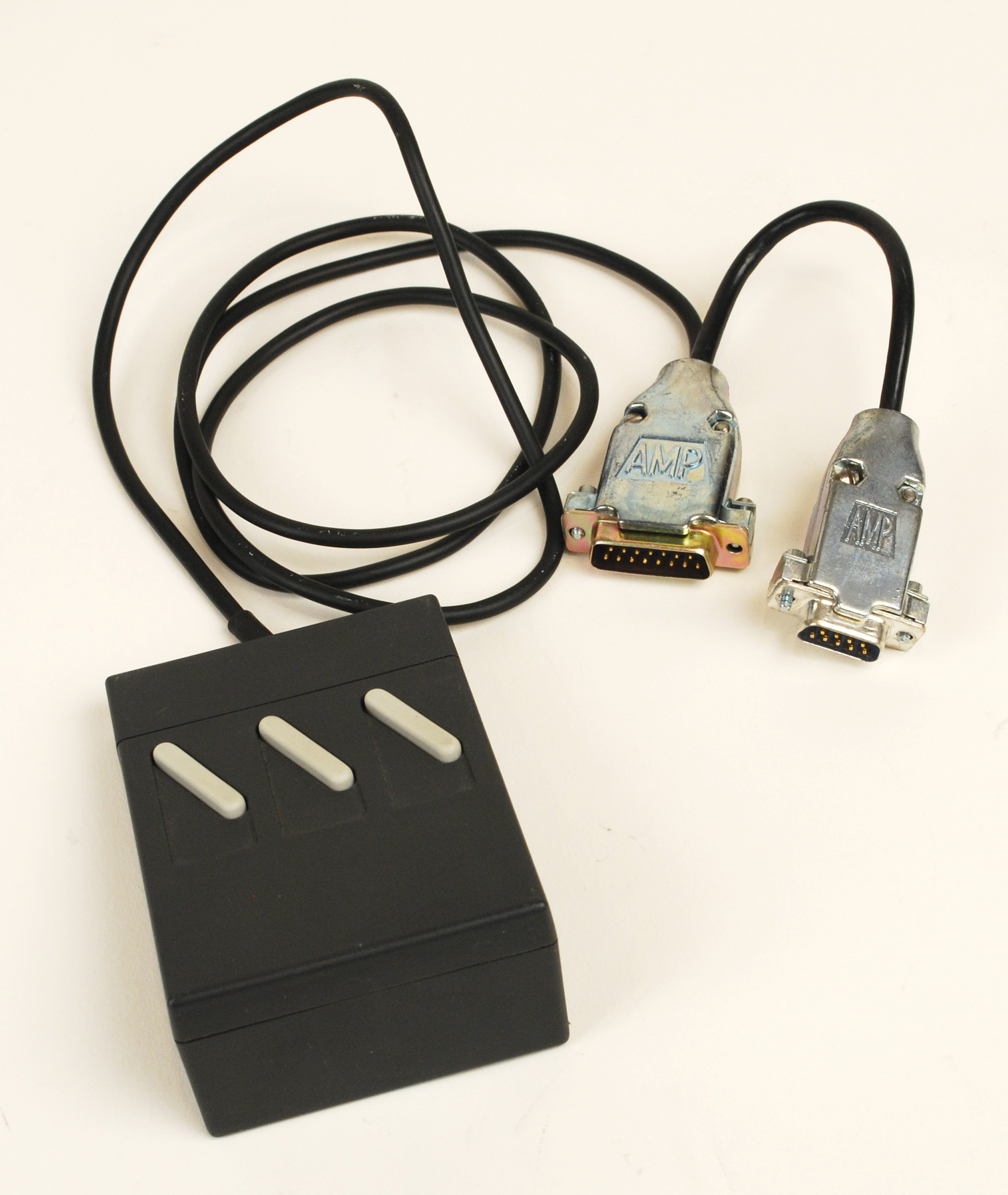
Logitech's second-generation mouse, the Logimouse (1983)

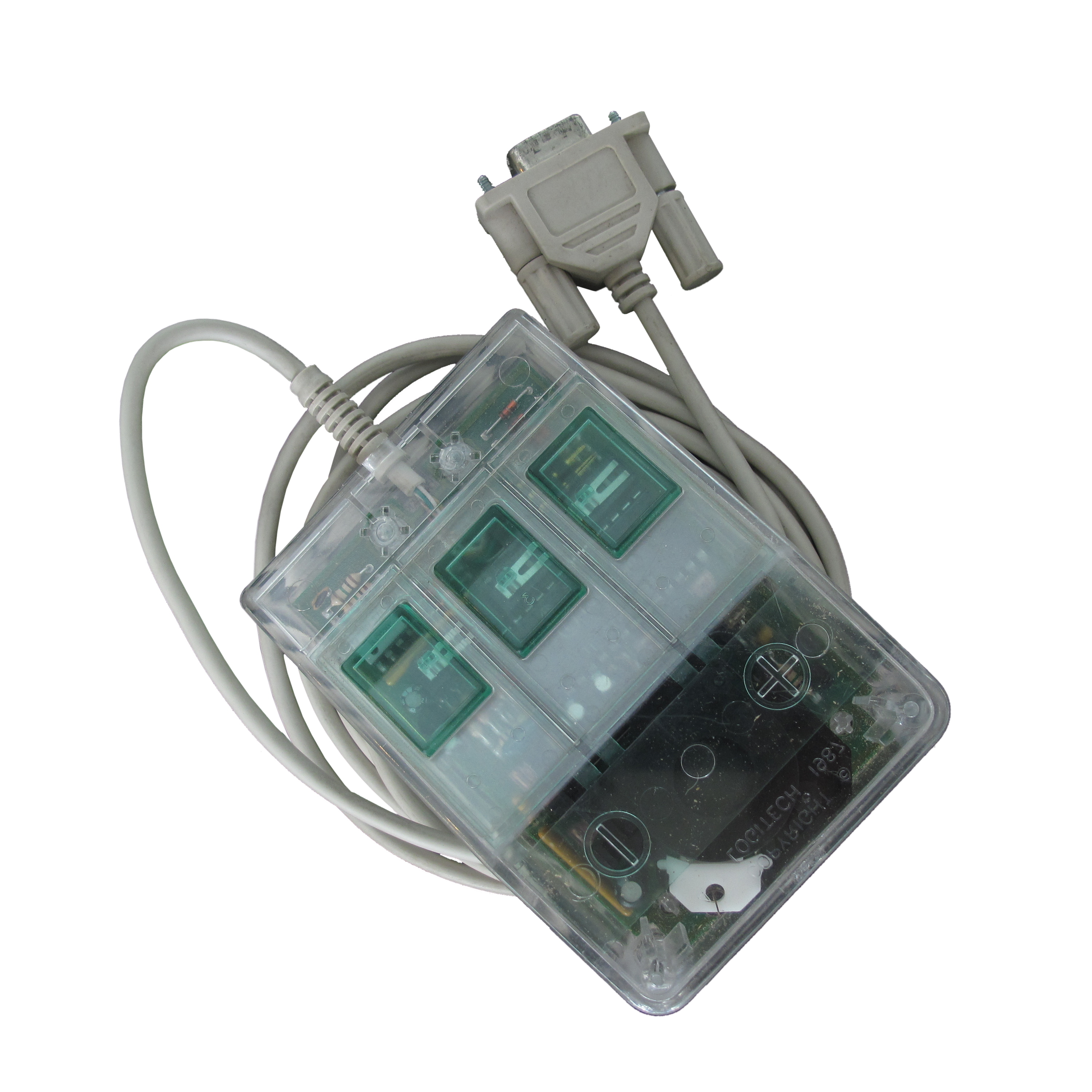
A transparent version of the C7 mouse (1985), the first serial mouse to draw its supply voltage directly from the serial port

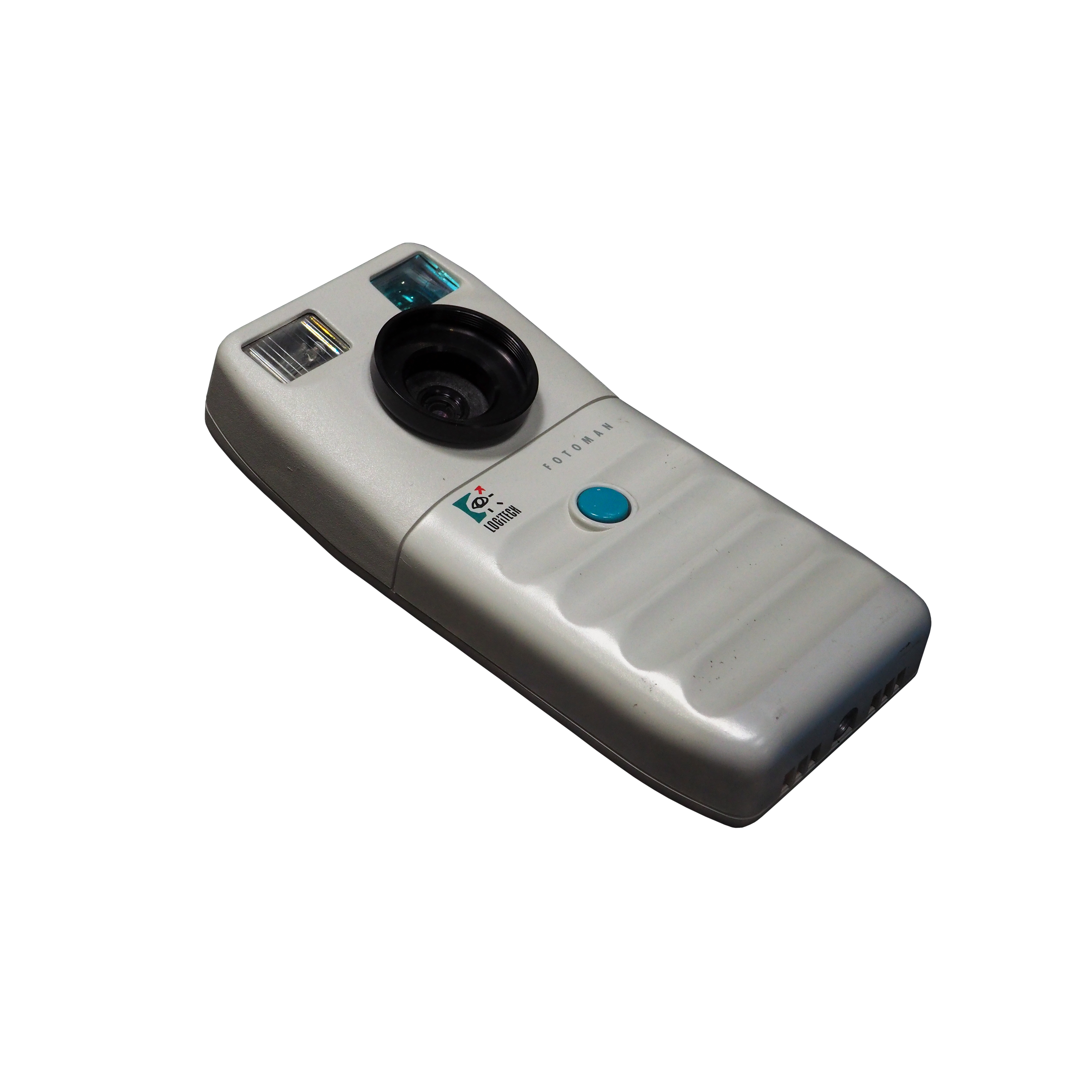
Logitech FotoMan, an early digital camera

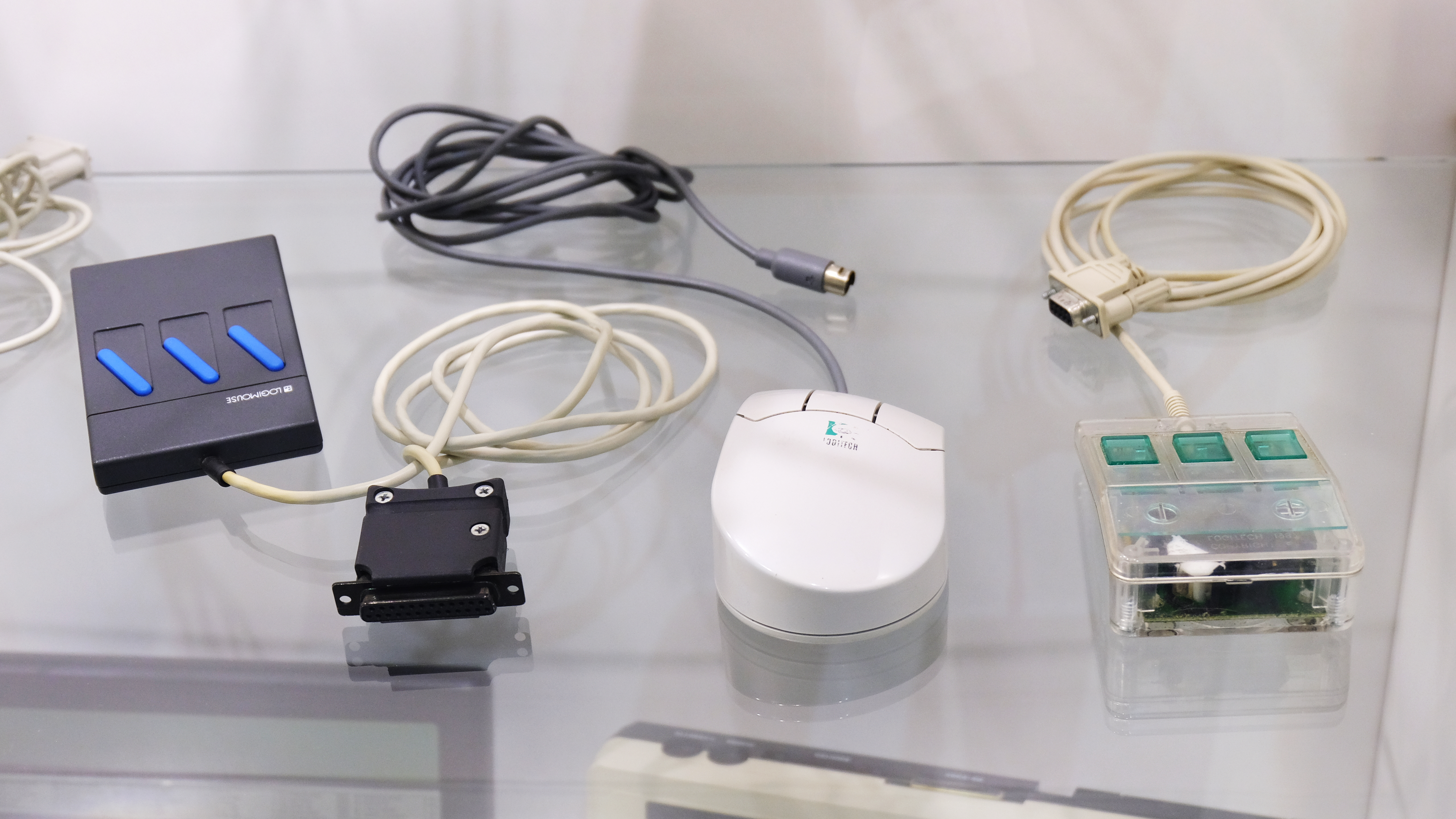
Logitech mice in the Enter Museum (Switzerland)

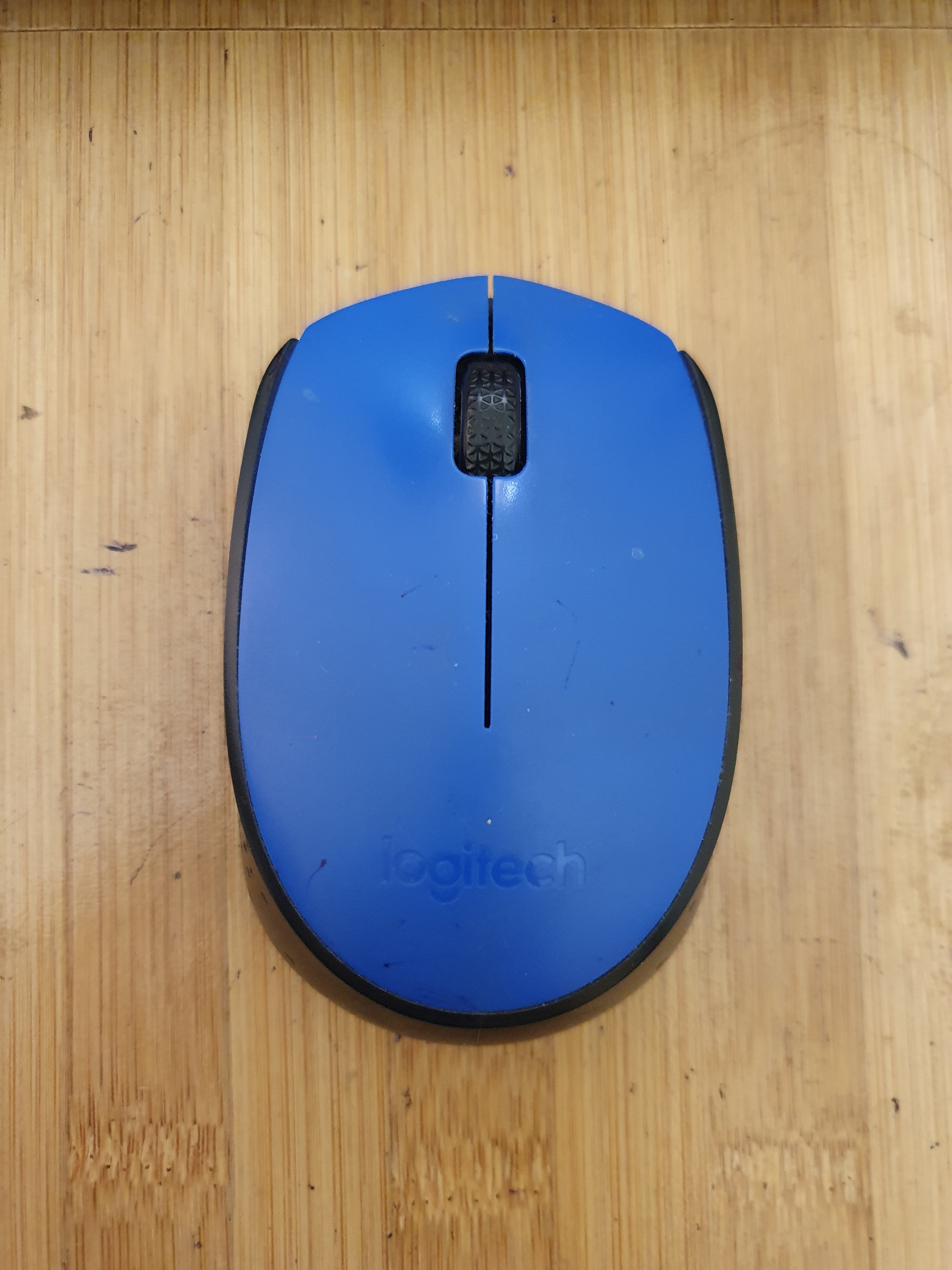
A contemporary (2021) Logitech M171 mouse
