= Thumbtack (company) =

American online marketplace

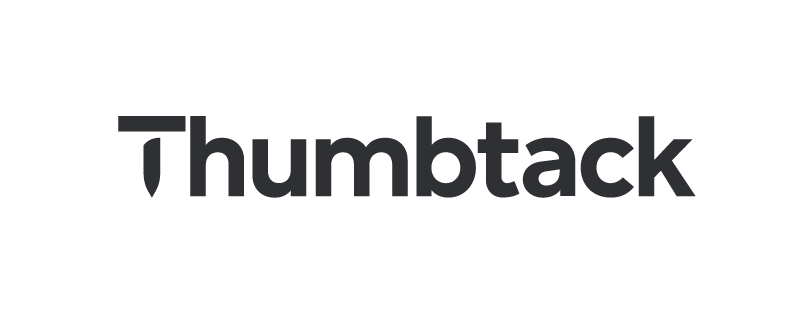
- Company type: Private
- Website type: Consumer service
- Available in: English
- Founded: 2008; 18 years ago
- Headquarters: San Francisco, California
- Founders: Marco Zappacosta; Jeremy Tunnell; Jonathan Swanson; Sander Daniels
- CEO: Marco Zappacosta
- Key people: Larry Roseman (CFO); Llibert Argerich (CMO)
- Revenue: US$400 million
- Website: thumbtack.com
- Current status: Active

Thumbtack is an American online home services marketplace that allows users to locate and hire professionals for home improvement projects.

Founded in 2008 and headquartered in San Francisco, California, the platform allows customers to compare prices, read reviews, and hire local professionals directly through its website and mobile app. The company is privately held and backed by investors including Sequoia Capital, Tiger Global Management, Javelin Venture Partners, Baillie Gifford, and Capital G. Thumbtack operates as a remote, virtual-first company, with employees across the U.S., Canada, and the Philippines.

== History ==
Thumbtack was founded in San Francisco, California, in 2008, by Marco Zappacosta, Jeremy Tunnell, Jonathan Swanson, and Sander Daniels. Thumbtack was an early contributor to what would be coined the "gig economy." The company looked to solve pain points users experienced on platforms such as Craigslist, including lack of seller verification and reviews, and ease of use of these platforms. The platform was designed as a directory of service providers with listings including their photo, bio, and details of the services offered.

By February 2012, Thumbtack had reached 250,000 local merchants and service professionals utilizing the platform.

In December 2020, Thumbtack acquired Setter, a Toronto-based startup that offered virtual home consultations to help homeowners find home improvement vendors. The acquisition terms were not disclosed.

In April 2024, Thumbtack released an updated mobile app that offered automated recommendations, project advice, and AI-supported search capabilities. The app's redesign was largely based on millennial homeowner phone-centric habits and preferences. In August of that year, the company launched "Thumbtack for Real Estate," a service that allowed buyers, through their agents, to find support on home improvement projects.

As of June 2025, American business magazine Forbes reported that 300,000 local professionals from service businesses are active on the platform.

=== Funding and revenue ===
In June 2010, Thumbtack.com raised $1.2 million in funding, primarily from angel investors. In January 2012, Thumbtack raised another $4.5 million through a Series A round of venture capital funding. In June 2013, Thumbtack raised an additional $12.5 million through a Series B round of venture capital funding. In May 2014, Thumbtack raised $30 million through a Series C round of venture capital funding from Sequoia Capital and Tiger Global Management. In August 2014, Thumbtack raised $100 million through a Series D round of venture capital funding, led by Google Capital. In September 2015, Thumbtack raised $125 million of venture capital funding, in a Series E round led by Baillie Gifford.

In July 2019 the company secured $150 million at a valuation of nearly $1.7 billion, in a Series F round led by Sequoia Capital. In July 2021 the company raised $275 million at a $3.2 billion valuation led by the Qatar Investment Authority.

In July 2024, the company announced $75 million in debt financing from Silicon Valley Bank. In its 2024 fiscal year, American business magazine Fast Company reported that Thumbtack earned $400 million in revenue, with "billions of dollars" going to approximately 300,000 small businesses that work via the platform.

== Partnerships ==
In 2019, the company launched a local partnership network, starting with hyperlocal social media network Nextdoor. In March 2023, Thumbtack announced a partnership with American supermarket chain H-E-B, which allowed Thumbtack users to find nearby pet service providers on the platform. In June of that year, Thumbtack partnered with real estate marketplace Zillow, and conducted a study focused on anticipated costs for homeowners including homeowners insurance, annual maintenance and utilities.

In April 2024, Thumbtack announced an integration with customer relationship management platform ServiceTitan. Later that year, peer-to-peer online marketplace OfferUp announced a partnership with Thumbtack to host a local home repair and maintenance businesses marketplace.

In January 2025, Thumbtack partnered with American artificial intelligence company OpenAI as an early research partner for Operator, an agentic AI tool in OpenAI's generative AI chatbot ChatGPT and was one of the first app integrations into ChatGPT.

In February 2025, the company partnered with virtual assistant Amazon Alexa. In June 2025, Thumbtack partnered with real-estate broker Redfin, wherein Redfin users could hire professionals for their claim homes via Thumbtack.

== Accolades ==
In 2018, Thumbtack was named as one of Fast Company's most innovative companies. The company has been recognized for its workplace culture and remote work practices.
