= Unified Communications Interoperability Forum =

Non-profit alliance between communications vendors

Unified Communications Interoperability Forum (UCIF)
- Merged into: International Multimedia Telecommunications Consortium (IMTC)
- Founded: 2010
- Dissolved: 2014
- Type: Non-governmental organization
- Purpose: Communications Technology Interoperability
- Region served: Worldwide
- Members: 17 companies
- Website: http://www.ucif.org

The Unified Communications Interoperability Forum (UCIF) is a nonprofit alliance between communications technology vendors. It was announced on May 19, 2010, with the goal of maximizing the interoperability of UC based on existing standards. Founding members of UCIF were HP, Microsoft, Polycom, Logitech / LifeSize Communications, and Juniper Networks. On July 28, 2014, UCIF merged with the International Multimedia Telecommunications Consortium (UMTC) into one consortium.

== Unified communications ==
Unified communications (UC) is the integration of real-time communication services such as instant messaging (chat), presence information, Telephony (including IP telephony), video conferencing, call control, and speech recognition with non real-time communication services such as unified messaging (integrated voicemail, e-mail, SMS, and fax). UC is not a single product, but a set of products that provides a consistent unified user interface and user experience across multiple devices and media types.

UC also refers to a trend to offer business process integration, i.e. to simplify and integrate all forms of communications in view to optimize business processes and reduce the response time, manage flows and eliminate device and media dependencies.

== Members ==
The original founding members were HP, Juniper Networks, Logitech / LifeSize Communications, Microsoft, and Polycom. Other members were Acme Packet, Huawei, Aspect, AudioCodes, Broadcom, BroadSoft, Brocade Communications Systems, ClearOne, Jabra, Plantronics, RADVISION, Siemens Enterprise Communications, Teliris, Vidyo, and VOSS Solutions. At launch, news outlets drew attention to the absence of Cisco and Avaya from the member list, though UCIF has invited them to join as early members.

On July 28, 2014, UCIF merged with the International Multimedia Telecommunications Consortium (IMTC) into one consortium.

== See also ==
- Unified communications
- Telepresence
- Unified messaging
- List of unified communications companies
