= Fuze (company) =

American communications and software company

Fuze, Inc.
- Company type: Private
- Industry: Unified Communications as a Service (UCaaS)
- Founded: 2006
- Founders: Steven Kokinos; Derek Yoo
- Headquarters: Boston, MA, USA
- Number of locations: 21
- Key people: Brian Day (CEO); Edward M. Durkin (CFO); Chris Jones (CRO); Elisa Gilmartin (CPO); Rob Scudiere (COO); Chris Conry (CIO); David Donatelli (SVP); Eric Hanson (CMO)
- Products: Voice calling, audio and video conferencing, chat, and analytics
- Number of employees: 600 (June 2021)
- Website: fuze.com

Fuze (formerly known as ThinkingPhones) is a cloud communications and collaboration software platform designed for the enterprise. Fuze was acquired by 8x8. The company is headquartered in Boston, Massachusetts.

== Products ==
Fuze's main product combines business voice, videoconferencing, text, instant messaging, content sharing, and collaboration apps under a single cloud service to deliver both traditional phone systems and mobile devices a seamless transition between communication methods. It runs on a natively-developed platform, and is focused primarily on large enterprise and mid-market customers. The company also provides analytics and real-time intelligence, with an expanded version of caller ID that pulls information from a caller's online profiles to provide more information on the caller. Mobile enhancements to Fuze offer mobile workers more flexibility and control, while maintaining the full capabilities of the Fuze platform. The products can integrate with existing enterprise software services, such as Slack, Salesforce, Gmail, Microsoft Teams, and Zapier.

The company's unified communications and collaboration (UCC) services include Fuze Pro, a subscription cloud-based service for voice calling and collaboration. It offers unlimited outbound calls in one country, integrated email and voicemail, group chat, Fuze Meetings for up to 1,000 participants, APIs, usage reports, analytics, and integration with Salesforce. Other UCC offerings include Fuze Calling and Fuze Success Plans, which are collections of services and resources to teach customers best practices in the UCaaS field.

In March 2020, Fuze introduced its contact center as a service (CCaaS), which integrates with its unified communications as a service (UCaaS) platform. On May 25, 2020, Fuze announced the launch of the Fuze 6 platform, for an improved user, administrator, and contact center user experience. In February 2021, Fuze announced Fuze for Manufacturing, an offering that adds targeted supply chain, distribution and logistics, employee capabilities, and integrations with applications commonly used by manufacturing companies to its typical offerings. In June 2021, Fuze announced the standalone Fuze Contact Center, for enterprise companies requiring a contact center for their customers, providing contact center features such as call routing and queuing.

The company's customers include Associated Press, PGA Tour, National Geographic, AstraZeneca, Waste Management, Yamaha Corporation of America, and PTC. Fuze competes with Google, Microsoft and Cisco in offering a combination of phone, videoconferencing, text and related services.

== History ==
=== Thinking Phone Networks (2006–2016) ===
Thinking Phone Networks was founded in 2006 by Steven Kokinos and Derek Yoo, as an enterprise software company. Kokinos was previously a co-founder of BladeLogic, where Yoo was a product manager. Thinking Phones' initial focus was unifying voice, text and conferencing services through an Internet-based platform. Originally marketed as a business VoIP or hosted PBX replacement service for mid-market and enterprise customers, the company expanded its services to provide messaging, presence, video services, collaboration and analytics within the unified communications industry. In 2010, Thinking Phone Networks launched one of the first mobile business phone applications on the iOS store, and later released an Android version of the service.

Thinking Phone Networks took its first venture capital in January 2010, a $1.2 million equity financing from Capstone Partners. Following rounds included $16.5 million in October 2012, led by venture capital firms Advanced Technology Ventures and Bessemer Venture Partners; $10 million in October 2013 from the same firms; and $56.7 million of funding in December 2014, led by Technology Crossover Ventures. In 2016, after raising a new round of $112 million in private financing from Summit Partners, Bessemer Venture Partners and Technology Crossover Ventures, the company brought its total fundraising to over $200 million since its founding.

The company grew from 200 employees at the beginning of 2015 to over 700 by the end of the year.

=== Rebranding to Fuze (2016–present) ===
In November 2015, Thinking Phones acquired San Francisco-based cloud voice and video conferencing company FuzeBox, which was founded in 1998 by Jeff Cavins as CallWave, a publicly traded company. In 2009, it was taken private and renamed FuzeBox.

On February 9, 2016, Thinking Phones announced that it had rebranded itself as Fuze. The name change was intended to indicate that the company had moved beyond exclusively phone-related offerings and to better reflect its core offerings, as a unified platform for voice, video, and collaboration.

On February 17, 2017, Colin Doherty was announced as CEO of Fuze. Steve Kokinos will oversee corporate strategy as executive chairman.

In May 2019, Fuze announced it has raised $484.8 million to date in total funding. On January 21, 2021, the company announced it had raised an additional $13.6 million from existing investors, including Bessemer Venture Partners and Summit Partners.

On June 5, 2019, Fuze launched Flex Summit, a one-day industry event bringing together experts in technology, HR, operations, and management to explore the future of distributed work. Flex Summit 2021 was a five-day virtual event, exploring the future of flexible work.

On December 11, 2019, amid a layoff of approximately 25% of all staff, Brian Day was named the company's new chief executive officer. He originally joined the company in December 2016 as chief financial officer. Rob Scudiere was named president and COO. On February 5, 2021, Edward M. Durkin was named chief financial officer, and Dan MacDonnell was named senior security advisor.

In addition to its headquarters in Boston, the company has locations in New York, Ottawa, London, Aveiro (Portugal), Paris, and Sydney.

== Acquisitions ==
Starting in 2014, ThinkingPhones began acquiring companies with a purpose of building a full communications stack in the cloud, to provide messaging, phone and video services, along with caller data.

In August 2014, the company acquired Whaleback Managed Services, a provider of cloud-based phone services for medium-sized businesses, re-launching Whaleback's brand name to ThinkingPhones that year.

In February 2015, ThinkingPhones acquired Contactive, which provides contact information from a caller, connecting profiles and identities created by people and businesses online and associating them with a telephone number to create an identity graph. Contactive gathers information from sources including Facebook, Twitter, LinkedIn, Google and Yelp.

== Partnerships ==
In March 2019, Fuze announced a partnership with Samsung to provide mobile unified communications as a service for remote and distributed workers.

In September 2019, Fuze announced an integration with Slack, enabling users to seamlessly toggle between the two platforms when moving from a Slack conversation to a Fuze call or meeting. Fuze integrates with Google Meet, Zoom, Webex, Microsoft Teams, and GoToMeeting, to launch and join videoconferences seamlessly.

In March 2021, Fuze announced a partnership with privacy and security company Theta Lake, to assist companies in protecting sensitive data when collaborating. Fuze also updated its Microsoft Teams and Slack integrations to a higher level of security.

== See also ==
- Private branch exchange
- Unified communications
- Unified messaging
- Video conferencing
