= Versit =

- Website: versit.com at the Wayback Machine (archived 1997-10-12)

Versit was a standardization initiative by Apple Computer, AT&T, IBM and Siemens in the early 1990s in order to create Personal Data Interchange (PDI) technology, open specifications for exchanging personal data over the Internet, wired and wireless connectivity and Computer Telephony Integration (CTI). The Consortium started a number of projects to deliver open specifications aimed at creating industry standards.

== Computer telephony integration ==
One of the most ambitious projects of the Consortium was the Versit CTI Encyclopedia (VCTIE), a 3,000 page, 6 volume set of specifications defining how computer and telephony systems are to interact and become interoperable. The Encyclopedia was built on existing technologies and specifications such as ECMA's call control specifications, TSAPI and industry expertise of the core technical team. The volumes are:

- Volume 1, Concepts & Terminology
- Volume 2, Configurations & Landscape
- Volume 3, Telephony Feature Set
- Volume 4, Call Flow Scenarios
- Volume 5, CTI Protocols
- Volume 6, Versit TSAPI

Appendices include:

- Versit TSAPI header file
- Protocol 1 ASN.1 description
- Protocol 2 ASN.1 description
- Versit Server Mapper Interface header file
- Versit TSDI header file

The core Versit CTI Encyclopedia technical team was composed of David H. Anderson and Marcus W. Fath from IBM, Frédéric Artru and Michael Bayer from Apple Computer, James L. Knight and Steven Rummel from AT&T (then Lucent Technologies), Tom Miller from Siemens, and consultants Ellen Feaheny and Charles Hudson. Upon completion, the Versit CTI Encyclopedia was transferred to the ECTF and has been adopted in the form of ECTF C.001. This model represents the basis for the ECTF's call control efforts.

Though the Versit CTI Encyclopedia ended up influencing many products, there was one full compliant implementation of the specifications that was brought to market: Odisei, a French company founded by team member Frédéric Artru developed the IntraSwitch IP-PBX. Odisei was later acquired by semiconductor company 8x8, which deployed the IntraSwitch technology as the second largest standalone U.S. VoIP service provider.

== Personal data interchange ==
In 1995 and 1996, the Consortium proposed and went on to create the vCard and vCalendar technologies. vCards were intended to make it easy for many people using computers connected to the Internet to exchange contact information, while vCalendars were intended to make it easy for people to swap scheduling information.

In December 1996, all rights to these technologies were transferred to the Internet Mail Consortium, an organization founded by Paul Hoffman (VPNC), which continued to maintain the standards until 2002, when the IMC ceased its activities.

This was later extended to create technologies for VToDo, to transfer ToDo details between computing devices, and vBookmark, to transfer URLs between computing devices.
