= Callware =

Software company in the telecommunication industry

Callware Technologies, Inc.
- Type: Private
- Industry: Telecommunications, Software
- Founded: 1994 / 1988
- Headquarters: Salt Lake City, Utah
- Products: Unified Communications
- Website: www.callware.com

Callware Technologies, Inc. (Callware) is a software company in the telecommunication industry, headquartered in Salt Lake City, Utah. It specializes in developing unified communication and unified messaging solutions for the US Department of Defense, government, educational institutions, and mid to enterprise business.

Callware is known for its Callegra.UC product, which provides voicemail, unified messaging, auto attendant, text to speech (TTS), voice recognition, and clients to access voice and fax messages from the telephone, desktop client, or the Internet.

Callware produces a high security version of its products for the US Department of Defense which is listed on the Approved Products List (APL) and is JITC certified on a regular basis. This product is currently in use at over 100 US Department of Defense sites and military bases worldwide.

Callware Technologies product Callegra.UC is used as a replacement technology for legacy systems, unsupported systems, end of life systems, or mismatched voicemail systems due to its ability to integrate with many switches and various vendors.

Callware's products have received awards from Network Magazine, Frost & Sullivan, Network Computing Magazine, and PC Magazine, among others.

== Corporate history ==
In 1994, Callware Technologies was incorporated as a result of a spin-off from International Voice Exchange, a service bureau and software development company founded in 1988.

At that time, Callware introduced its unified messaging and unified communications product — Callegra. Callegra became the first voicemail product in the market to give Users the ability to access, send, and receive voicemail and fax messages directly from a computer desktop interface. Subsequent versions integrated Callegra's GUI with Novell GroupWise, Microsoft Outlook, Lotus Notes, and various web browsers.

In 1998, Callware started providing Callegra to government agencies and the US Department of Defense (DoD).

In 2002, Callware introduced its flagship product, Callegra.UC. Callegra.UC added a .NET Web Service, allowing custom client applications to be developed for the Callegra.UC unified messaging and communication product. This new feature opened PBX functions and voicemail services through programming of SOAP and .NET.

In 2004, Callware enhanced its flagship product and released the Department of Defense (DoD) edition Callegra.UC JITC, which added enhanced high security features. Callegra.UC JITC became the first product of its kind to obtain Joint Interoperability Test Command (JITC) Certification and Information Assurance (IA) Accreditation in October 2004, and is the only product of its kind to be listed on the DoD Approved Products List (APL).

== See also ==
- Unified Communications
- Unified Messaging
- Voicemail
