= Unified voicemail =

Unified voicemail is the combination of different voicemail bearers into a single voicemail system. Using dedicated DID /DDI numbers for each mailbox, the mailbox can be used on a variety of devices and end-points. This is similar to what GSM providers use for their voicemail systems. Mobile phones and traditional analog phones need to support conditional call diversion to enjoy unified voicemail. Unified voicemail can be extended into unified messaging as already used.

== Advantages ==
Some telephone users have several telephone accounts, which may include home, work, mobile, and SIP numbers. Unified voicemail provides a single voicemail for several accounts.

== See also ==
- Unified communications
- Unified messaging

== Providers ==
- Alcatel - provider of unified communication services.
- Avaya - provider of communication systems, applications, and services.
- Cisco - a vendor of unified messaging and telecommunications for corporate use.
