= Jitsi =

Videoconferencing and messaging software

Jitsi Desktop

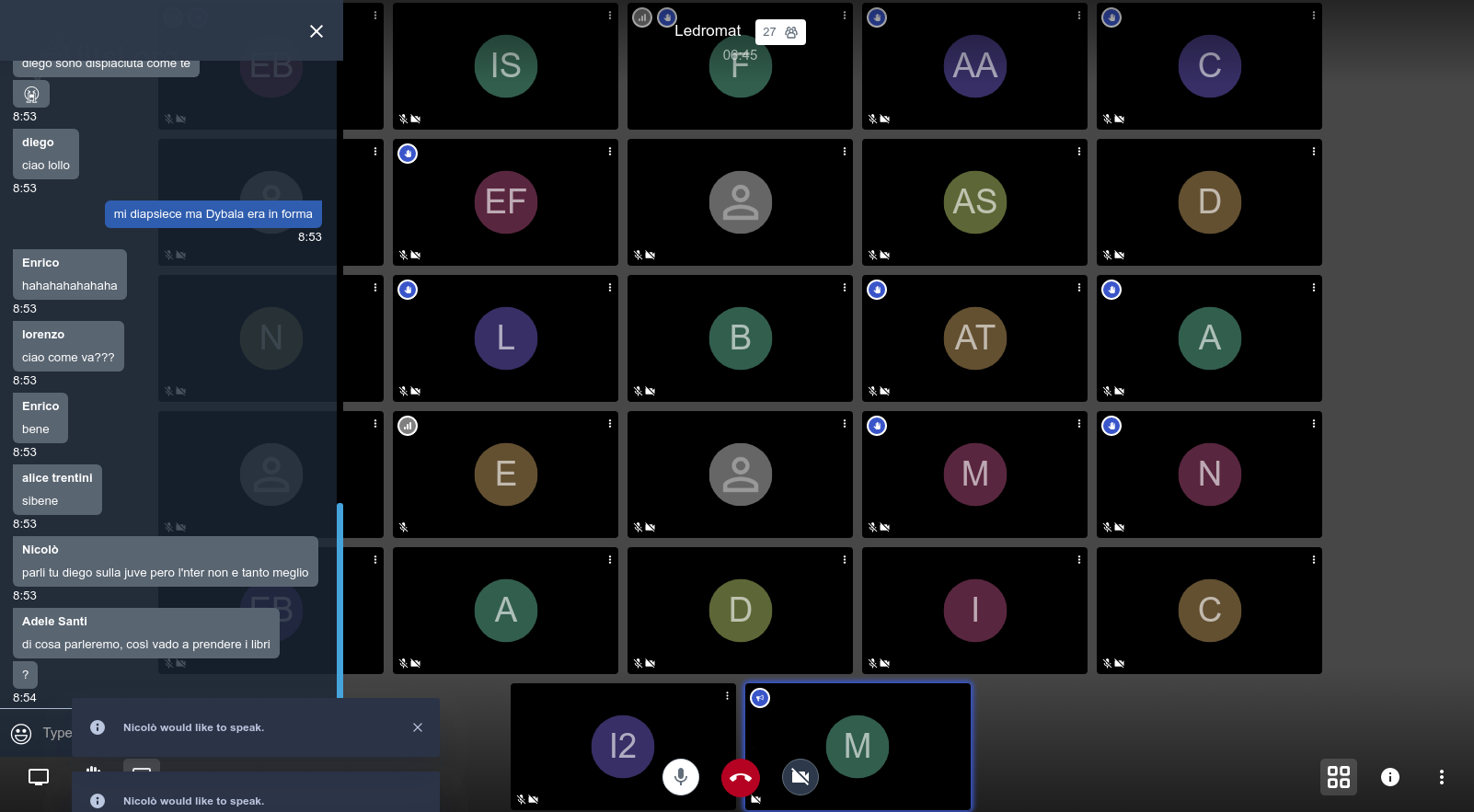
- Original author: Emil Ivov
- Developers: Community contributors, 8x8
- Release: 2003; 23 years ago
- Stable release: 2.10.5550 / 1 October 2017
- Preview release: 2.11.5633 / 8 November 2020
- Written in: Java, JavaScript, TypeScript, Lua
- Operating system: Linux, macOS, Windows, Android, iOS, iPadOS, watchOS
- Available in: English, French, German, Bulgarian, Japanese, Spanish, Italian, Romanian, Greek and 25 more
- Type: Voice over IP, instant messaging, videoconferencing
- License: Apache-2.0
- Website: jitsi.org
- Repository: github.com/jitsi/jitsi

Jitsi (from Bulgarian: жици, "wires") is a collection of free and open-source multiplatform voice (VoIP), video conferencing and instant messaging applications for the Web platform, Windows, Linux, macOS, iOS, iPadOS, watchOS, and Android. The Jitsi project began with the Jitsi Desktop (previously known as SIP Communicator). With the growth of WebRTC, the project team focus shifted to the Jitsi Videobridge for allowing web-based multi-party video calling. Later the team added Jitsi Meet, a full video conferencing application that includes web, Android, iOS, iPadOS, and watchOS clients. Jitsi also operates meet.jit.si, a version of Jitsi Meet hosted by Jitsi for free community use. Other projects include: Jigasi, lib-jitsi-meet, Jidesha, and Jitsi.

Jitsi has received support from various institutions such as the NLnet Foundation, the University of Strasbourg and the Region of Alsace, Data Consultancy Services, the European Commission and it has also had multiple participations in the Google Summer of Code program.

== History ==
Work on Jitsi (then SIP Communicator) started in 2003 in the context of a student project by Emil Ivov at the University of Strasbourg. It was originally released as an example video phone in the JAIN-SIP stack and later spun off as a standalone project.

=== BlueJimp (2009–2015) ===
In 2009, Emil Ivov founded the BlueJimp company, which has employed some of Jitsi's main contributors, in order to offer professional support and development services related to the project.

In 2011, after successfully adding support for audio/video communication over XMPP's Jingle extensions, the project was renamed to Jitsi since it was no longer "a SIP only Communicator". This name originates from the Bulgarian "жици" (wires).

Jitsi introduced the Videobridge in 2013 to support multiparty video calling with its Jitsi clients using a new Selective Forwarding Unit (SFU) architecture. Later that year initial support was added to the Jitsi Videobridge allowing WebRTC calling from the browser. To demonstrate how Jitsi Videobridge could be used as a production service, BlueJimp offered a free use of its hosted system at meet.jit.si.

On November 4, 2014, "Jitsi + Ostel" scored 6 out of 7 points on the Electronic Frontier Foundation's secure messaging scorecard. They lost a point because there has not been a recent independent code audit.

On February 1, 2015, Hristo Terezov, Ingo Bauersachs and the rest of the team released version 2.6 from their stand at the Free and Open Source Software Developers' European Meeting 2015 event in Brussels. This release includes security fixes, removes support of the deprecated MSN protocol, along with SSLv3 in XMPP. Among other notable improvements, the OS X version bundles a Java 8 runtime, enables echo cancelling by default, and uses the CoreAudio subsystem. The Linux build addresses font issues with the GTK+ native look and feel, and fixes some long-standing issues about microphone level on call setup when using the PulseAudio sound system. This release also adds the embedded Java database Hyper SQL Database to improve performance for users with huge configuration files, a feature which is disabled by default. A full list of changes is available on the project website.

=== Ownership by Atlassian (2015–2018) ===
Atlassian acquired BlueJimp on April 5, 2015. After the acquisition, the new Jitsi team under Atlassian ceased meaningful new development work on the Jitsi Desktop project and expanded its efforts on projects related to the Jitsi Videobridge and Jitsi Meet. Regular contributions from the open source community have maintained the Jitsi Desktop project.

In 2017, jitsi was added as a widget to Element instant messaging client.

=== Ownership by 8x8 (2018– ) ===
In October 2018, American cloud provider 8x8 acquired Jitsi from Atlassian. 8X8 claimed to keep Jitsi open source.

== Primary projects ==
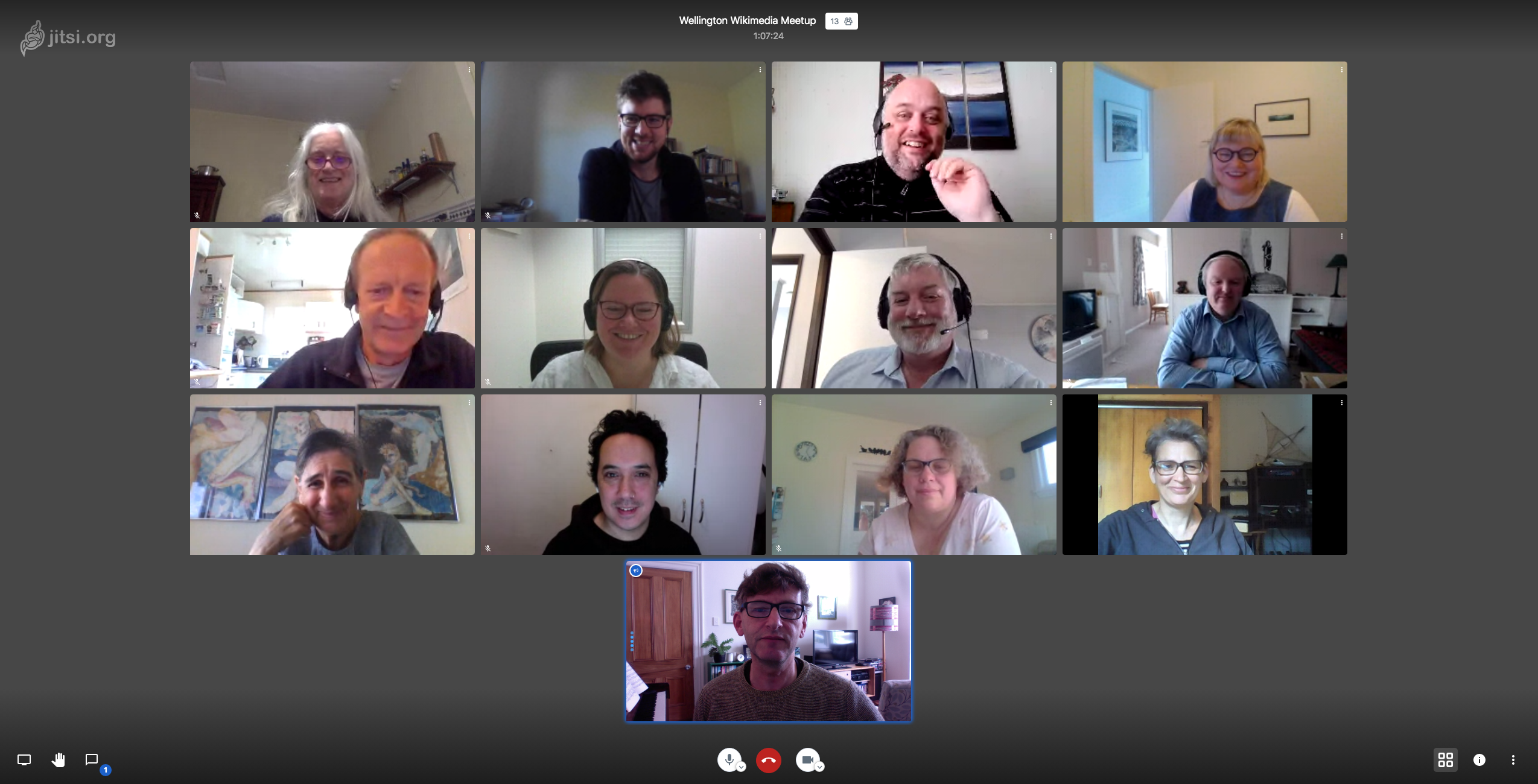
Video conferencing in Jitsi

The Jitsi open source repository on GitHub currently contains 132 repositories. The major projects include:

Jitsi Meet
Video conferencing server designed for quick installation on Debian/Ubuntu servers
Jitsi Videobridge
WebRTC Selective Forwarding Unit engine for powering multiparty conferences
Jigasi
Server-side application that allows regular SIP clients to join Jitsi Meet conferences hosted by Jitsi Videobridge
lib-jitsi-meet
Low-level JavaScript API for providing a customized UI for Jitsi Meet
Jidesha
Chrome extension for Jitsi Meet
Jitsi
Known as Jitsi Desktop, an audio, video, and chat communicator application that supports protocols such as SIP, XMPP/Jabber, AIM/ICQ, and IRC.

=== Jitsi Meet ===
Jitsi Meet
Stable release
- Web: 2.0.11031 / 8 June 2026; 5 months ago
- Android: 25.4.0 / 4 August 2025; 15 months ago
- iOS, iPadOS, watchOS: 25.4.0 / 4 August 2025; 15 months ago
- Type: Videoconferencing
- License: Apache-2.0
- Website: jitsi.org/jitsi-meet/
- Repository: github.com/jitsi/jitsi-meet

Jitsi Meet is an open source JavaScript WebRTC application used primarily for video conferencing. In addition to audio and video, screen sharing is available, and new members can be invited via a generated link. The interface is accessible via web browser or with a mobile app. The Jitsi Meet server software can be downloaded and installed on Linux-based computers. Jitsi owner 8x8 maintains a free public-use server for up to 100 participants at meet.jit.si.

==== Key Features of Jitsi Meet ====
- Jitsi implemented end-to-end encryption (E2EE) with dynamic key management in 2021. The original static E2EE configurations that were initially required while the dynamic key management system was first implemented have since been deprecated and removed and additional support for mobile applications added. In addition, the Jitsi Videobridge (JVB) adds an additional layer of TLS encryption at the transport layer between the server and the desktop/mobile/API clients for enhanced security.
- Recording: Jitsi offers the ability to record meetings by streaming them to YouTube. Self-installed Jitsi Meet deployments need to install and set up Jibri to support this capability. The client also has the capability to save a local recording.
- Using only a standards-compliant web browser to run Jitsi Meet in a browser, no additional client software besides a browser is required to join a Jitsi meeting.

=== Jitsi Videobridge ===
Jitsi Videobridge is a video conferencing solution supporting WebRTC that allows multiuser video communication. It is a Selective Forwarding Unit (SFU) and only forwards the selected streams to other participating users in the video conference call, therefore, CPU horsepower is not that critical for performance.

=== Jitsi Desktop ===
Jitsi spawned some sister projects such as the Jitsi Videobridge Selective Forwarding Unit (SFU) and Jitsi Meet, a video and web conferencing application. To prevent misunderstanding due to the increasing popularity of these other Jitsi projects, the Jitsi client application was rebranded as Jitsi Desktop.

Originally the project was mostly used as an experimentation tool because of its support for IPv6. Through the years, as the project gathered members, it also added support for protocols other than SIP.

Jitsi Desktop is no longer actively maintained by the Jitsi team, but it is still maintained by the community.

Features

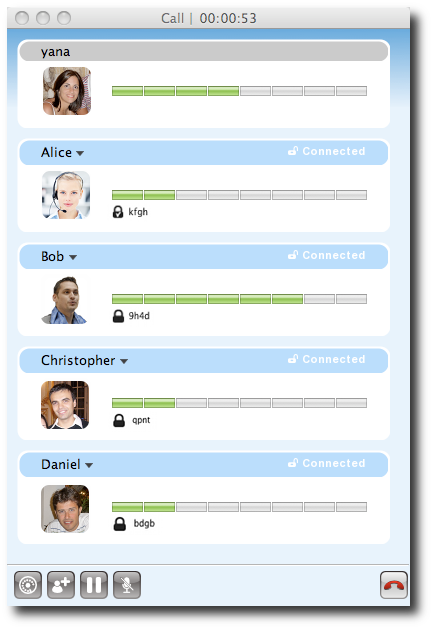
Jitsi Desktop's conference call window on Mac OS X

Jitsi supports multiple operating systems, including Windows as well as Unix-like systems such as Linux, Mac OS X and BSD. The mobile apps can be downloaded on the App Store for iOS, iPadOS, and watchOS; and on the Google Play Store and F-droid platform for Android. It also includes:

- Attended and blind call transfer
- Auto away
- Auto re-connect
- Auto answer and auto forward
- Call recording
- Call encryption with SRTP and ZRTP
- Conference calls
- Direct media connection establishment with the ICE protocol
- Desktop Streaming
- Encrypted password storage using a master password
- File transfer for XMPP, AIM/ICQ, Windows Live Messenger, YIM
- Instant messaging encryption with OTR (end-to-end encrypted)
- IPv6 support for SIP and XMPP
- Media relaying with the TURN protocol
- Message waiting indication (RFC 3842)
- Voice and video calls for SIP and XMPP using H.264 and H.263 or VP8 for video encoding
- Wideband audio with SILK, G.722, Speex and Opus
- DTMF support with SIP INFO, RTP (RFC 2833/RFC 4733), In-band
- Zeroconf via mDNS/DNS-SD (à la Apple's Bonjour)
- DNSSEC
- Group video support (Jitsi Videobridge)
- Packet loss concealment with the SILK and Opus codecs

== Reception and usage ==
In an April 2020 test of video conferencing services, a US product review by the New York Times Wirecutter recommended Jitsi Meet as one of its two picks (after the more feature-rich Cisco Webex, which it found preferable for large groups and enterprises), stating that Jitsi was "easy to use and reliable" and that "in our testing, the video quality and audio quality were both great – noticeably sharper and crisper than on Zoom or Webex".

During the COVID-19 pandemic in April 2020, 8x8 reported 10.4 million active users globally per month.

Several organizations and universities have set up their own Jitsi-based videoconferencing services, among them fairkom, with fairmeeting, hosted on a scalable kubernetes cluster in the EU, and Goethe University Frankfurt.

As of 2023 the non-profit organization Digitalcourage discourages the use of the free meet.jit.si service, as it is not free of tracking, requires authentication at Google, GitHub, or Facebook and is hosted at AWS, which is not generally GDPR-compliant.

== See also ==
- Comparison of instant messaging protocols
- Comparison of instant messaging clients
- Comparison of VoIP software
- Comparison of web conferencing software
- List of free and open-source software packages
- Session Initiation Protocol
- BigBlueButton
