= 8x8 =

American provider of voice over IP products

8x8, Inc.
- Type: Public
- Traded as: Nasdaq: EGHT
- Industry: Cloud-based business communications
- Founded: 1987; 39 years ago
- Headquarters: Campbell, California, U.S.
- Number of locations: US, UK, Romania, Australia, Singapore, Portugal
- Key people: Samuel Wilson (CEO); Jaswinder Pal Singh (Chairman); Kevin Kraus (CFO); Hunter Middleton (CPO); Stephen Hamill (CRO); Bruno Bertini (CMO); Walt Weisner (CCO); Bryan R. Martin (CTO)
- Products: Cloud communications; Unified communications; Contact centers; Communications platform as a service (CPaaS)
- Brands: Jitsi
- Revenue: ▲US$736 million (2024)
- Operating income: ▲US$19 million (2024)
- Net income: ▲US$2 million (2024)
- Total assets: ▼US$663 million (2024)
- Total equity: ▲US$102 million (2026)
- Number of employees: 1,948 (2024)
- Website: 8x8.com
- Footnotes; Financials as of May 19, 2026

8x8, Inc. is an American provider of cloud communications and customer experience software. The company offers unified communications and communications platform as a service (CPaaS) products delivered through a cloud-based architecture. It is headquartered in Campbell, California.

== History ==
The company was founded in 1987 by Chi-Shin Wang and Y. W. Sing as Integrated Information Technology, Inc. (IIT). According to the company, IIT began as an integrated circuit designer. During the late 1980s it produced math coprocessors for x86 microprocessors and graphics accelerator cards for the personal computer market. The company changed its name to 8x8 in 1996, and began producing products for the videoconferencing market.

8x8 went public on the Nasdaq in 1997. In March 2000, it relaunched itself as a VoIP service provider under the name Netergy Networks. The company changed its name back to 8x8 in July 2001, and began trading on the Nasdaq SmallCap Market on July 26, 2002.

In 2003, the company launched a videophone service. In July 2007, after the startup SunRocket was liquidated, 8x8 agreed to take on 200,000 of its customers.

The company moved its listing to the New York Stock Exchange (NYSE) in 2017, keeping the ticker symbol EGHT, and transferred back to Nasdaq in November 2022.

8x8 was included on Business Insider's "America's Most Innovative Businesses" 2027 list.

== Products and services ==
The 8x8 platform combines unified communications (UCaaS), contact center (CCaaS) and CPaaS services, with artificial intelligence features across the platform. It also has a technology partner ecosystem for integration with third-party products, including Salesforce, ServiceNow, HubSpot, Google and Microsoft. 8x8 also provides authentication and fraud-prevention services for SMS, voice and video APIs.

In July 2026, the company announced a new partner program aimed at direct resellers. It also launched 8x8 Small Business, an offering that reseller partners can sell to customers with fewer than 100 licenses in the UK, Ireland and Australia.

In April 2026, the company unveiled AI Studio, a tool that lets contact center teams build and deploy AI agents on their existing platforms. It also introduced 8x8 AI Routing, an organization-wide routing engine that matches customers to available staff or resources in real time. In June 2026, 8x8 announced that it would provide workforce management (WFM) tools to contact center customers at no additional cost.

8x8's unified communications products include:

- 8x8 Work: cloud telephony, messaging and video meetings
- 8x8 Conversation IQ: conversational analytics and transcription
- 8x8 FrontDesk: receptionist console
- Microsoft Teams integrations, including Operator Connect and Direct Routing
- 8x8 Engage: contact center services

== Acquisitions ==
8x8 has acquired several companies in the VoIP, cloud services, contact center and video conferencing industries.

In May 1999, 8x8 acquired Odisei, an IP telephony software developer. In May 2000, it acquired U|Force to gain network and server VoIP technologies.

In May 2010, 8x8 acquired Central Host, a California-based managed hosting company. In June 2011, it announced the acquisition of Zerigo, a Colorado-based cloud services company, and in September 2011 it acquired Contactual, a hosted contact center company. In 2013, it acquired Voicenet, a UK-based cloud services company.

In May 2015, 8x8 acquired DXI Ltd., a privately held UK-based provider of cloud contact center software, for $26 million in cash and stock. The following month, it acquired the assets of the privately held Quality Software Corp. (QSC) and two affiliated companies. In May 2018, 8x8 acquired MarianaIQ to strengthen its AI capabilities.

In October 2018, 8x8 acquired Jitsi, an open-source chat and video conferencing tool, from Atlassian. In July 2019, it acquired Wavecell, a Singapore-based CPaaS provider. In January 2020, 8x8 acquired the Finnish startup callstats.io, a SaaS service that monitors call quality in WebRTC apps.

On December 1, 2021, then-CEO Dave Sipes announced that the company intended to acquire Fuze, an enterprise cloud communications company. The acquisition was completed on January 18, 2022. In January 2026, 8x8 acquired Singapore-based Maven Lab, expanding its presence in the Asia-Pacific region.
