= Business communications operations management =

Category of management products

Business communications operations management (BCOM) is a category of management products that automate the configuration and operations of modern enterprise communications solutions.

== History ==
The category BCOM was identified by UC Strategies in March 2015, to define a specific capability for the operation of advanced Business Communications and Unified Communications systems. BCOM is aimed at replacing time-consuming manual configuration processes with automation tools to reduce operational costs and minimize the risk of manual error.

== The requirement for BCOM ==
Solving the challenges of increasingly sophisticated communications environments in typical enterprises and organizations requires focusing on the user and business needs, not just technology. BCOM automates and optimizes the configurations and operations of these systems based on business processes and user-centric needs, resulting in reduced costs and increased adoption.

Management systems provided by the UC platform vendors are still labor-intensive and focus on a single set of vendor devices and systems. BCOM systems focus on delivering the value of business communications across multiple vendors and are user-centric.

Through optimized workflow processes, user-centric profiles, and business process integration, BCOM enables an organization to maximize the value of its investment and reduce operational costs. BCOM provides required flexibility and accuracy for UC adoption and enables a company's resources to focus on strategic issues. By optimizing resources and their use, the overall cost can be better managed.

== Provisions and Features ==
With increased sophistication of Business Communications/UC with new capabilities such as Multiplicity of devices, Application integration– CEBP and Heterogeneous, multi-vendor environments along with Consumerization expectations and New technologies, BCOM addresses problems like multiple configurations per event increases likelihood of missed configurations or mis-configured elements by providing single point of configuration and operational control features like single pane of glass.

The impact of business communications operations management has helped improved communications solution SLAs and service delivery reduced errors and issues and resulted in an adoption increase.

== BCOM Differentiators ==
Traditional vendor management and tools are about the system, platform, and device configuration. These solutions are very manual, requiring both significant times as well as vendor-specific expertise. While they may improve on pure manual configuration, the complexity of multiple systems, manual process, and lack of defined process integration makes vendor solutions labor-intensive and prone to errors and lack of resource control. BCOM changes the game by delivering a platform that configures and operates the communications solutions based on user and business needs as well supporting multiple communications elements in an orchestrated solution.
