= Unified communications management =

Unified communications (UC) management is essentially the management of unified communications; it refers to the systems used by enterprise organizations to automate their enterprise communications services and the voice network infrastructure that those services run over (i.e. how they connect to the PSTN).

== History ==
As with most technologies, as UC evolves from early adopter to mass market adoption, the focus changes from service features to service quality and cost. As the UC technology lifecycle matures, the focus on UC management increases.

The need for UC management has evolved from the growing complexity that surrounds next generation communications environments. As the demands on a company’s communication platform increases – with the introduction of new UC services and applications – the task for an IT team to manage the platform manually becomes more and more complex. Employees need to be trained in multiple systems and the company needs to invest in separate ticketing systems, knowledge systems and reporting systems to manage the complexity.

UC management, and its ability to automate complex business processes, introduce repeatable administrative tasks and centralize the operation of the entire corporate communications platform, is becoming increasingly appealing. Ticketing systems, reporting systems and knowledge systems are all replaced by a central UC management platform.

More recently, unified communications services have moved into the cloud and have become UCaaS (Unified Communications as a Service). All UCaaS providers use advanced UC management platforms to manage their cloud services. These UC management platforms must be able to support multiple customers (often referred to as multi-tenant).

UC management vendors include: Park Bench Solutions, VOSS Solutions, Kurmi Software, Arcana, Ensim, Tivoli, NAV360, SpanLink, UBiqube, SoftLink, Metropolis Corp, Metreos, Leonid Systems, Fidelus, Uplinx, Variphy, Visionael, Voyence, ATEA, Sector Six. Most UC vendors are also creating their own UC management solutions, as they realize that the market adoption of their applications will be much higher if management is in place.

== Unified communications ==
Unified communications (UC) refers to a set of enterprise communications applications that improves business and individual productivity. Applications include:

- Voice (hundreds of voice features, including call forwarding, speed dials, hunt groups, call waiting, call park, barge, do not disturb, call recording, paging, etc.)
- Directories (corporate directory that lists all relevant users in the organization and their numbers) - Click to call is a common feature from a directory
- E911 (emergency services that allows the location of a caller to 911 to be identified within a large company office)
- Audio bridge (a meeting room, where people can call in to hold a conference)
- Document share (a central repository that allows secure access to documents, under flexible business rules)
- Computer-telephony integration (linking phone and computer systems, to enable click to call and the control of voice calls from the computer applications)
- Unified messaging (instant messaging, voicemail messaging and single mailbox)
- Extension mobility (where a user can move offices and their phone extension follows them to whatever phone they log into)
- Single number reach (sometimes call “find-me-follow-me” – where a user can direct a call to simultaneously ring on a number of devices)
- Fixed-mobile integration (where a call can be switched back and forth between a cell phone and a desk phone, mid-call, without breaking the session)
- Soft phone (a client application that operates on a laptop computer and can make phone calls, just like a regular desk phone. This allows for remote work by the user with an office phone number)
- Smart mobile client (a client application that operates on a smart mobile device and can connect to the company PBX. The user can remotely operate as though they are in the office)
- Presence (allows a user to view all their contacts and see whether those contacts are available or not)
- Audio conferencing (a voice-only conference call, with 3 or more people)
- Video conferencing (a voice and video conference, with 3 or more people)
- Web conferencing (a voice and web conference, with 3 or more people, where documents can be viewed online in a shared environment)
- High definition video telephony (calls on video enabled phones, where users call and see each other in real time. The HD refers to the high level of quality and is also known as Telepresence. The idea is that the high definition allows users to see the facial expressions of each other, so the experience is like being in the same room.)
- Video meeting room (similar to an audio bridge, but for video devices)
- Personal meeting rooms
- Enterprise social networks (similar to Facebook, but for the enterprise)
- Content distribution (Allows a corporation to deliver content to employees in a secure way)
- Contact center (provides advanced call flow management from customers to agents, based on skills groups)
- Communications aware business processes

The key to unified communications is that all applications work together in a seamless way. An example might be a user starts an IM with a contact, they switch to a voice call, they invite a 3rd person to join the call, they switch the call to a video and web conference and invite several more people, some of whom are remote workers. They finally record the conference and post it to a personal meeting room.

Unified communications (UC) management is a software solution that automates the configuration of all the UC application services, the end-user devices and the underlying network infrastructure (such as gateways, switches, session boarder controllers and the inter-connecting trunks). Unified communication applications do not work out of the box. They need to be configured before they will work seamlessly, and there are many thousands of settings available to create a highly customized solution for each company’s unique requirements. UC management also provides:

1. A service management capability that groups the myriad UC services and their features, as well as devices, into logical, easy to understand profiles. This enables a service catalogue to be created and then this catalogue is available to administrators to allocate to individual users. Without service management, each user would need to have each and every service feature and device checked or unchecked – a process that would take many hours.
2. A web-based, “business” portal to allow both technical and non-technical administrators to perform set-up and change management processes, all from a single “pane of glass”. Without UC Management, engineers are required to manually configure each of the various individual application servers and network systems. This manual process is highly complex and engineers need to gain certification from the UC vendors before they are allowed to configure the UC servers.
3. An end-user self-care web portal which allows users to self-manage their own devices and services.

== Uses ==
UC management’s primary use is to reduce the total cost of ownership of enterprise communications. Administration tasks that might otherwise have taken many hours to configure manually can be automated, therefore taking less time to complete and becoming less costly to the company. A UC management platform can support organizations throughout the lifecycle of a UC service:

- Day-0: Through the phase of designing and building the UC platform
- Day-1: Through the phase of migrating new phones and UC applications onto the platform
- Day-2: Through the phase of day-to-day administration and operation
- Day-3: As the platform needs to be upgraded, scaled to a larger size, or to cater for mergers and acquisitions

UC management introduces significant productivity benefits as a few key strokes can trigger complex, multi-step workflow processes automatically and without human intervention. This improves administration efficiency and also reduces the skill levels required, freeing up the highly skilled engineers to focus on more value-adding tasks.

UC management also improves the quality of the UC experience. By ensuring that set-up and change management is performed in a highly accurate (i.e. no human errors) and highly repeatable (i.e. the design is implemented correctly on a consistent basis) fashion, the productivity of the company as a whole is improved.

UC management improves the end customer experience, as it opens up self-care opportunities to solve problems in real-time, and to make changes to settings at the touch of a button, from a mobile device.

UC management also provides a single point of integration between the organization’s IT systems (e.g. cost accounting, or HR system) and the communications platform. Without UC Management, there would need to be a separate point of integration from each IT system to every UC application server. This would become an integration “spiders-web”.

== Technology ==
UC management technology is based around intelligent workflow management, but with specialized UC drivers. The objective of UC management is to create a set of standard processes for very complex, multi-service, multi-device, multi-network configuration workflows.

The way that most management tools work is to have a fixed design, which allows the configuration variables to be abstracted into templates and maintains workflow as standard processes. Automation of the initial configuration of a UC platform is only possible if there can be a standard process to follow. You cannot automate a totally variable process. Hence the fixed design is abstracted into templates.

Once the platform is deployed with the fixed design, the UC management technology holds the entire configuration centrally and so can then easily apply change control processes effortlessly.

In some cases, UC management vendors opt not to try to standardize the set-up processes, as this is seen to be too complex. Instead they perform a “sync” process with the application servers to learn what configuration has been applied. This approach limits these management tools to purely an administrative role for change management (otherwise known as “moves, adds, changes and deletes MACDs). The initial configuration of the UC servers and the network infrastructure is still performed manually by engineers and the UC automation is applied to a fully working system. This limits the benefits, but is a simple to apply management approach.

The very latest UC management technology can operate in either of the above modes:

1. Abstracted templates and standard workflow to allow automation of the initial configuration and subsequent change management.
2. “Sync” mode for change management only.

But most importantly, the latest technology can support hybrid solutions. In other words, they can support a mix of operational modes and multiple vendor platforms.

Better still, a very small group of vendors have completely changed the UC management model, such that there is no standardization used. These vendors have adopted the latest web technology to allow their business portals to be “self-generating”. This means that the user interfaces are no longer fixed by hard coded software. Once the user interfaces are no longer fixed, this means that even workflow can be templated.

The net result of this approach is to enable total customization of the UC management platform. This means that the design can be totally flexible, and can even be changed over time. The value of this approach is initially going to be felt in the large enterprise market and UCaaS cloud UC markets. But over time, it is expected that this new technology will be applied across the industry and all vendors will follow suit.

== See also ==
- FCAPS

== Further reading and additional references ==
- Robin Gareiss, Nemertes
  - Tough to Argue With Data: UCC Management Slashes Opex
  - Unify Square Powers Up Skype4B Platform
  - UCC Management Vendor Selection Guide
- Marty Parker – NoJitter - Value in the Mobility Craze?
- Beth Schulz, NoJitter - Don't Be Blindsided by Phone Number Mismanagement
- Abdel Kander, LinkedIN
  - Explaining UC to your boss
- Gary Audin – Telecom Reseller
  - You Have To Do It; UC Management and Configuration
  - Enterprises: Effectively Manage Your UC
  - EDUcast: Resellers – Profit from UC Management
- Gary Audin, Webtorials - Automating UC Service Fulfillment in the Enterprise
- Christopher May, NoJitter
  - UC Deployment Greatly Exaggerated
- Zeus Kerravala
  - Final Thoughts From Cisco
  - Big data can help accelerate UC Adoption
  - UC Management moving towards one pane no pain
  - The challenges associated with managing private clonds
  - It is time for the enterprization of the consumer
- Irwin Lazar, Nemertes
  - Cisco and the rise of the hybrid cloud
