= H100 =

H100 or H-100 may refer to:

== Technology ==
- NVIDIA H100, a GPU
- H.100 (computer telephony), a standard for communication between PCI cards in a computer telephony system
- Heathkit H100, a kit by Heathkit sold assembled as the Zenith Z-100 computer
- iRiver H100 series, a series of hard drive digital audio players produced by iriver

== Transportation ==
- H100 series, a diesel multiple unit train in Japan
- Hyundai Grace, a minibus or van
- Hyundai Porter, a pickup truck
- H100, the fourth generation of Toyota HiAce
