= Gordon Matthews =

Gordon Matthews may refer to:

- Gordon Matthews (inventor) (1936–2002), American inventor and businessman
- Gordon Matthews (politician) (1908–2000), British chartered accountant and politician
