= SFU (disambiguation) =

SFU may refer to:

== Universities ==
- Saint Francis University, in Loretto, Pennsylvania, United States
- Saint Francis University, in Tiu Keng Leng, Hong Kong
- Siberian Federal University, in Krasnoyarsk, Russia
- Sigmund Freud Private University, two private universities in Vienna, Austria and Paris, France
- Simon Fraser University, a Canadian public university in Burnaby, British Columbia, Canada
  - Simon Fraser University Pipe Band, Grade 1 pipe band associated with the university

== Parties/Societies ==
- Youth of the Socialist People's Party (Socialistisk Folkepartis Ungdom), a Danish socialist youth organization
- Societe Francaise des Urbanistes, a French society of Urban planners

== Other ==
- San Francisco Unicorns, an American T20 cricket team
- Services for UNIX, a software package providing a Unix-like environment within Microsoft Windows
- Six Feet Under (disambiguation)
- Solar flux unit, a unit of incident solar energy falling on a surface
- Soul Flower Union, a Japanese musical group
- Star Fleet Universe, a variant of the Star Trek universe
- Selective Forwarding Unit, a kind of videoconferencing server
