= H.100 (computer telephony) =

Legacy telephony equipment standard published by the ECTF

H.100 and H.110 Computer Telephony Standards
- Type: Computer telephony bus standards
- Abbreviation: H.100, H.110
- Published: 1996–1997
- Developer: Enterprise Computer Telephony Forum
- Industry: Computer telephony integration
- Purpose: Hardware and software integration standard in telephony systems
- Supersedes: MVIP, SCSA
- Platform: PCI and CompactPCI

H.100 and H.110 are legacy computer telephony bus standards published by the Enterprise Computer Telephony Forum (ECTF) that enable communication between components in computer telephony systems. They support high-density applications such as call centers and telecommunications equipment.

H.100 applies to standard PCI systems, while H.110 is designed for CompactPCI platforms used in industrial and carrier-grade equipment. Both standards evolved from earlier technologies like MVIP and SCSA to address industry fragmentation and provide greater scalability.

== Background and development ==
Before H.100/H.110, the computer telephony industry used various competing standards like MVIP and SCSA for connecting telephony boards within computer systems. While these earlier standards successfully enabled some cross-vendor compatibility, they had limitations in capacity, scalability, and platform support that became apparent as the industry grew.

The Enterprise Computer Telephony Forum, formed in 1995, developed H.100/H.110 in the mid-1990s to address these limitations while maintaining backward compatibility with existing technologies. The standards were designed to unify the fragmented computer telephony market under a common, open architecture that could support both existing PCI systems and emerging CompactPCI platforms.

== Technical specifications ==
=== Architecture ===
H.100/H.110 are TDM (Time-Division Multiplexing) bus standards that function as high-speed digital highways within computer telephony systems. TDM divides a single communication channel into multiple time slots, allowing many simultaneous conversations to share the same physical connection without interference.

The standards support up to 4,096 simplex channels, equivalent to 2,048 full-duplex voice conversations simultaneously. This capacity represents a significant increase over earlier standards and makes them suitable for large-scale applications including high-density call centers, telecommunications carrier equipment, and media gateways connecting traditional telephone networks to IP networks.

=== Implementation ===
H.100 is implemented using Multi-Channeled Buffered Serial Ports (McBSP), specialized serial interfaces typically included on DSP (Digital Signal Processing) chips. The McBSP interface consists of four main signal lines:

- CK (Clock): Provides timing synchronization across all connected components
- FS (Frame Sync): Marks the beginning of each time frame for proper data alignment
- DR (Data Receive): Carries incoming voice and data streams
- DX (Data Transmit): Carries outgoing voice and data streams

=== Platform differences ===
H.100 is designed for standard PCI systems, commonly used in desktop computers and low-to-medium density telephony applications. PCI-based H.100 systems typically use ribbon cables to connect telephony boards within a computer chassis, making them suitable for office-based implementations.

H.110 extends H.100 to CompactPCI platforms, ruggedized architectures designed for industrial and telecommunications carrier applications. CompactPCI systems offer hot-swap capability (boards can be inserted and removed while the system continues running), rugged construction for harsh environments, and higher component density than standard PCI systems.

== Backward compatibility ==
A key design goal was maintaining compatibility with existing telephony systems and investments. H.100/H.110 functions as an interoperable superset of MVIP-90, H-MVIP, and SCbus.

== Industry impact and adoption ==
=== Market adoption ===
H.100/H.110 gained significant adoption in the late 1990s and early 2000s, supported by major telecommunications manufacturers through the ECTF. The standards brought unified telephony bus capabilities to both PCI and CompactPCI platforms, with H.110 offering particular advantages for carrier-grade applications through its hot-swap capability.

=== Transition to VoIP ===
As the telecommunications industry transitioned from traditional TDM-based systems to VoIP (Voice over Internet Protocol) in the early 2000s, demand for TDM-based standards like H.100/H.110 declined. VoIP systems use standard computer networks and Internet protocols rather than specialized telephony buses, reducing the need for TDM-based integration standards.

== Legacy ==
While H.100/H.110 have been superseded by VoIP technologies, they played a crucial role in unifying the computer telephony industry during the transition from proprietary systems to open standards. The principles established by H.100/H.110, particularly in providing high-density, multi-vendor interoperability, influenced subsequent developments in telecommunications integration architectures.

== See also ==
- Time-division multiple access
- TDM Bus
