= Odisei =

Odisei, S.A.
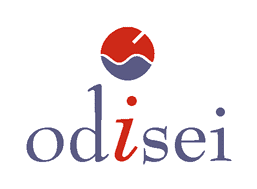
- Company type: Private
- Founded: February 1998
- Founder: Frédéric Artru
- Headquarters: Sophia-Antipolis, France
- Website: odisei.com at the Wayback Machine (archived 1999-05-02)

Odisei S.A. was a French company based in Sophia-Antipolis, France that developed the first Internet protocol private branch exchange (IP-PBX) software solution hosted by carriers. (Note: Frédéric Artru launches Odisei in Sophia-Antipolis) It was founded by Frédéric Artru in 1998 based on his work at the Versit Consortium. Odisei was acquired by 8x8 in May 1999. It is likely the highest return on investment on a time-basis for a French-based technology company (50 to 1 ROI for seed investors).

Odisei offered the IntraSwitch IP-PBX, a Java-based solution that runs on a carrier-grade server located at a telephony service provider's site and provides voice and data services to individuals, small and large businesses, local exchange carriers and Internet service providers. IntraSwitch is to this date the sole complete implantation strictly following the Versit CTI ENcyclopedia specifications.

After acquisition by 8x8, Odisei changed its name to Netergy Networks Software Division then to Centile. In 2003, Centile was bought out from 8x8 by Eurotel, a Nordic countries private investor group. (Note: Centile becomes independent again after being bought out from 8x8) Centile has since focused its activities on premises-based IP-PBX products.
