= VOSS Solutions =

VOSS Solutions (VisionOSS Ltd)
- Logo used since 2021
- Type: Private
- Industry: Unified communications; & collaboration; Digital Workplace Management
- Founded: Reading, Berkshire; United Kingdom 2003
- Founders: Henry Barton; Stefan Peters; Christopher May; Derek Lipscombe
- Headquarters: Garland, Texas; United States
- Area served: Worldwide
- Key people: Michael Frayne, CEO
- Products: VOSS UC automation management technology
- Revenue: $18m (2021); $15m (2018); $13m (2015); $12.2m (2012); £5.8m (2010); £2.2m (2007)
- Number of employees: 150
- Website: VOSS-Solutions.com

VOSS Solutions (or VisionOSS) is a British-founded multinational provider of digital workplace management technology, headquartered in Garland, Texas, that provides automation management software for unified communications, collaboration, productivity, and security tools.

== History ==
VOSS Solutions was established in 2003 with offices in Reading, Berkshire, United Kingdom, the USA, Australia, and Cape Town, South Africa. The company was co-founded by Henry Barton, Christopher May, Derek Lipscombe and Stefan Peters in Reading, Berkshire, United Kingdom. Lipscombe is a director of VOSS Solutions, Barton is the vice-president of strategy and Peters is the vice-president of sales. The company's chief executive officer (CEO) is Michael Frayne.

In 2005, VOSS became Cisco System's market partner for the service provider managed services market and then the UC domain management platform in Cisco's Hosted Collaboration Solution (HCS).

During this time, the company was a winner of the Total Telecom World Vendor Awards. It is also a past finalist of the UBM Tech Best of Enterprise Connect, the European Tech Tour UK & Ireland Tech Tour, The Sunday Times Tech Track 100 and the Clearwater Cloudex 20:20.

In 2008 and 2011, the company raised funding from investors . VOSS Solutions' $12m series B funding round in 2008 was spearheaded by Eden Ventures and XAnge Private Equity. The first phase of the company's $10m series C funding round in 2011 was led by Intel Capital, and included investment from existing investors Eden Ventures and XAnge Private Equity. Vodafone Ventures led the second phase of the series C funding round, acquiring an 8% stake.

In 2015, VOSS onboarded its 100th service provider customer and expanded its offering to include reporting and analytics products.

In 2016, VOSS started supporting both Microsoft and Cisco technology.

In 2017, VOSS signed an OEM agreement with LayerX Technologies, addressing the growing market need for insight into and understanding of UC platform performance.

In 2019, VOSS entered the contact center management market, and the Phone Server market in 2020

In 2020, VOSS was voted Best Service Management vendor by UC Today.

In 2021, VOSS launched VOSS MaaS – a UC automation management tool in a hosted delivery model. VOSS announced a new round of funding – $15m – from existing investors and shareholders to position the company for ongoing growth and expansion. The growth funding round was led by Verdane, the Northern European specialist growth equity investor, expanding the investment firm's shareholding in the company, with new investment capital from Claret Capital Partners who participated with both equity and debt. Existing investors, Vodafone Ventures and Foncière Georges Mignon NV, also supported the funding round.

At this time, VOSS acquired LayerX.

In 2022, VOSS was listed by Metrigy as a top UC management provider for Contact Center, as well as winning Best Service Management Platform in the UC Today awards, and with IDC citing VOSS as an Innovator in UC Management.

It was also the year for VOSS to focus in on the Microsoft Teams market, launching the VOSS Pivot Program in partnership with Microsoft to enable service providers to simplify the transition of their customers to cloud-based telephony.

In 2023, VOSS introduced a Cost Analytics initiative to support this emerging market need, giving customers visibility into their asset utilization, to reduce license expenditure and streamline technologies. In 2023, VOSS won the Megabuyte50 best performing company award, being cited as “highly commended” in two categories at the UC Awards. VOSS also celebrated its 20th birthday.

In 2024, VOSS was a finalist in the UC Awards Best Service Management Platform category, and won the Megabuyte50 award, and was selected for the Best Workforce Engagement Solution in the 2024 CX Awards. In 2024 VOSS unveiled its latest invention, called Wingman. It is an AI chatbot co-pilot designed to integrate with VOSS Automate.

In 2025, VOSS won the Best Workplace Management Tool award at the 2025 UC Awards, and was highly commended in the Best Service Management Platform category.

== Products and services ==
VOSS Solutions is a developer of digital workplace management software, with a focus on highly agile service orchestration. It is a provider of unified communications and collaboration middleware. The company is also a developer of SIP Trunking and SIP Application Server solutions. It has developed a number of unified communications and collaboration tools, including Unified Communications Business Analytics Solution (UC-BAS) and VOSS Migration Services, previously called Unified Communications On-Boarding Toolset (UC-OBT) or User Deployment Service. Its core product is the VOSS-4-UC service delivery platform.

=== VOSS Migrate ===
VOSS Migrate uses a complex methodology to discover, extract, transform, validate, and load large volumes of users, devices and UC services, to enable organizations to carry out UC migration projects. It is designed to work with Cisco Hosted Collaboration Solution (HCS), Microsoft, Avaya, Zoom, Pexip and other UC platforms.

=== VOSS Automate ===
VOSS Automate is a real-time automated unified communications and collaboration service delivery platform. It is a policy based platform that supports centralized creation and management of unified communications services and applications. VOSS works in multi-vendor and hybrid environments, and it supports both private and public cloud. It is designed to provide management and provisioning of unified communications and collaboration services for large enterprises and service providers or telecommunication networks.

Features of VOSS include web-based administration, central management with devolved admin and self-service, collaboration management across the lifecycle of a UC service, and contact center management. It is a business process layer that seamlessly integrates with third party UC, collaboration and other business tools, overarching the network infrastructure and communications architecture, to provide a single pane of glass view of the entire UC estate.

== Affiliations ==
The VOSS service delivery platform is deployed in many enterprise and service providers or telecommunication networks, including Inteliquent, Lattelecom, and Qwest., Alpine Health, BCX, FlexITy, Axians, Bucher + Suter, Node4 BT partnered with Cisco and VOSS Solutions to deploy cloud-based unified communications and collaboration services for the 2012 London Olympics.

== See also ==
- Operations support system (OSS)
- Software as a service (SaaS)
- Unified communications management
