= TDM bus =

A TDM bus is one application of time-division multiplexing. On a TDM bus, data or information arriving from an input line is put into specific timeslots on a high-speed bus, where a recipient would listen to the bus and pick out only the signals for a certain timeslot.

It resembles the TDM carried out in synchronous optical networking, but the "TDM bus" term is more commonly used when the bus is inside a single unit like a telecommunications switch or a PC.

A specification for putting a TDM bus on PCI hardware has been published as H.100/H.110 by the Enterprise Computer Telephony Forum (ECTF). These are not related to the ITU-T recommendations with the same identifiers.
