= Internet Mail Consortium =

- Formation: 1996
- Dissolved: 2002
- Website: imc.org at the Wayback Machine (archived 1999-02-18)

The Internet Mail Consortium (IMC) was an organization between 1996 and 2002 that claimed to be the only international organization focused on cooperatively managing and promoting the rapidly expanding world of electronic mail on the Internet.

== Purpose ==
The goals of the IMC included greatly expanding the role of mail on the Internet into areas such as commerce and entertainment, advancing new Internet mail technologies, and making it easier for all Internet users, particularly novices, to get the most out of the growing communications medium. It did this by providing information about all the Internet mail standards and technologies. They also prepared reports that supplemented the Internet Engineering Task Force's RFCs.

Headquartered in Santa Cruz, California, the IMC was founded by Paul E. Hoffman about 1996 and ceased activity in 2002.

== See also ==
- Versit Consortium
