= Six Feet Under =

Six Feet Under may refer to:

- A euphemistic phrase for burial or death

== Music ==
=== Groups ===
- Six Feet Under (band), an American death metal band, 1993–present

=== Albums and soundtracks ===
- 6 Feet Under (album), by Gravediggaz, 2004
- Six Feet Under (soundtrack), from the TV series, 2002

=== Songs ===
- "Six Feet Under" (Billie Eilish song), 2016
- "Six Feet Under" (Smash Into Pieces song), 2023
- "Six Feet Under" (The Weeknd song), 2016
- "Six Feet Under", by King Diamond from The Spider's Lullabye, 1995
- "Six Feet Under", by MeeK, 2008
- "Six Feet Under", by No Doubt from Return of Saturn, 2000
- "Six Feet Under", by VIXX from Zelos, 2016
- "Six Feet Under (Caleigh's Song)", by Hardy from Quit!!, 2024

== Television and film ==
- Six Feet Under (TV series), a 2001–2005 American drama series

== See also ==
- "6 Feet Underground", a 2000 song by Ja Rule
