= Multi-Vendor Integration Protocol =

The Multi-Vendor Integration Protocol (MVIP) is a hardware bus for computer telephony integration (Audiotex) equipment, a PCM data highway for interconnecting expansion boards inside a PC. It was invented and brought to market by Natural Microsystems Inc (now BPQ Communicationser).

The MVIP (Multi-Vendor Integration Protocol) is a technology used in the construction of call center equipment utilizing standard PCs. It provides a secondary communications bus within the computer, capable of multiplexing up to 256 full-duplex voice channels, which enables the transfer of voice data between different voice cards. Digital voice, fax, and video data are transmitted over a ribbon cable connected at the top of each ISA or PCI card. MVIP technology allows a PC to function similarly to a small-scale private branch exchange (PBX) system. The protocol accommodated for a variety of expansion boards, including trunk interfaces (usually T1 or ISDN), voice processing boards equipment speech recognition or fax processing. Each board could optionally provide a switch that could interconnect voice channels on the bus, allowing for a flexible routing of calls within the MVIP bus.

The MVIP bus was promoted as an alternative to the then-dominant PEB bus by Dialogic Corporation which had much less capacity and was not an open standard.
