= ECTF =

ECTF (the Enterprise Computer Telephony Forum) was formed in 1995 by telephony equipment and software suppliers to improve the interoperability of various vendors’ CT solutions. Until ECTF was formed, the computer telephony industry was an alphabet soup of competing software and hardware platforms. ECTF has sought to improve this situation, and to enhance the “scalability” of CT standards so that telephony systems serving the needs of small businesses as well as large, multinational corporations can be built using the same technology.

It consists of many working groups on different areas (e.g. Speech Recognition, etc.).

== Standards ==
- H.100 — a standard published by the CompTIA ECTF for communication between PCI cards in a computer telephony system.
