= Gordon Matthews (inventor) =

- Born: July 26, 1936; Tulsa, Oklahoma
- Died: February 23, 2002 (aged 65); Dallas, Texas
- Occupations: Inventor, businessman
- Known for: Commercialization of voicemail

Gordon Matthews (July 26, 1936 – February 23, 2002) was an American inventor and businessman and started one of the first companies which pioneered the commercialization of voicemail.

== History ==
Matthews was born in Tulsa, Oklahoma. After graduating from the University of Tulsa in 1959, with a bachelor's degree in engineering physics, Matthews joined the U.S. Marine Corps as an aviator.

Matthews' involvement in trying to mesh human voices to technology was many years in the making. A fellow friend and pilot perished in a mid-air collision, which Matthews believed was caused when he momentarily took his eyes off of his plane's controls to adjust his radio frequency. After he was discharged from the military, Matthews went to work for IBM to help develop voice-activated cockpit controls which would help lessen similar types of catastrophic errors in the future. After IBM, Matthews went to work for Texas Instruments in 1966.

=== Inspiration and first commercial system ===
Matthews has said that the inspiration for his invention came in 1970, while visiting a client's office on business. He noticed a number of trash bins overflowing with message slips used by receptionists and secretaries to inform their bosses that someone tried to call him while he was in a meeting or otherwise unable to take the call himself. Very quickly, he developed a concept for an electronic system to store and receive messages. His first attempt, he said, "...required 64 telephone lines, 114 Intel 8086 microprocessors and four refrigerator-sized 200-megabyte hard drives." The hard part would be to find a company willing to buy an untested system.

Matthews presented his concept at a conference attended by a Minnesota Mining and Manufacturing (3M) company executive named James Jensen, who immediately recognized the potential boom in executive productivity offered by the proposed system. By 1980, Jensen had persuaded his superiors to install the first system, which cost about $500,000 to serve about 3,000 users.

=== Founding of VMX ===
In 1979, Gordon Matthews founded a company in Texas called ECS Communications. The first VMX system was engineered by John Cayton under the direction of Gordon Matthews. In 1979, Matthews also filed a method patent for voicemail, which was granted on February 1, 1983. Matthews patented what was called "Voice Message Exchange," U.S. Patent No. 4,371,752, and was a significant patent for voicemail. While there was prior art for voicemail, Matthews' patent was never adjudicated and held up until its expiration. Matthews eventually held over thirty-five patents, many of which related to voicemail.

Matthews later changed the name of his company to VMX Inc. (Note: One source said that the company name stood for Voice Mail Express.) He eventually developed a 3,000-user voice messaging system called the VMX/64. VMX was arguably the first company to offer voicemail for sale commercially for corporate use. Matthews was able to sell his system to several notable large corporations, such as 3M, Kodak, American Express, Intel, Hoffman La Roche, Corning Glass, ARCO, Shell Canada, Zenith Data Systems and Westinghouse.

While some claim that VMX and Gordon Matthews invented voicemail or that he was the "father of voicemail", this claim is not true. The first inventor of record was Stephen Boies of IBM in 1973, six years before Matthews filed his first patent. IBM released its first implementation of Speech Filing System (SFS) in 1975, four years before VMX was launched. SMS was later called Audio Distribution System (ADS). Also, Delphi Communications of California first released their Delta 1 system in 1976, three years before the first patent filing by Matthews.

=== Legacy of VMX ===
In general, executives loved the voice mail systems, however time revealed some downsides:

- While executive productivity may have improved, many secretarial and administrative jobs were eliminated;
- Paper notices about calls were eliminated, but VM did not necessarily improve call-backs by recipients;
- Information technology (IT) employees were needed to maintain the VM system.
- By 1990, articles in the popular press complained about, "..."voice mail jail" – being trapped in a labyrinthine series of telephone prompts that never seemed to lead to a human.

In 1988, when VMX was on the verge of bankruptcy, it was acquired by Opcom, a designer and seller of computer software products for handling telephone calls. Opcom was acquired in 1994 by Octel Communications, the largest provider of voice mail equipment and services in the world. In 1997, Octel was acquired by Lucent Technologies and spun off several years later as part of Avaya.

== Death ==
In 2001, he became an executive of VTEL Corporation, a company based in Austin, Texas engaged in producing teleconferencing equipment. In 2002, VTEL renamed itself Forgent Networks.

At the time of his death in Dallas, Texas, from complications relating to a stroke on February 23, 2002.

Matthews was 65, and was survived by his wife, Monika, son Gordon, and only daughter, Christina.
