= Paul Hoffman (engineer) =

Paul E. Hoffman is an Internet pioneer, based in Santa Cruz, California. Hoffman has been involved with the Internet Engineering Task Force (IETF) since the early 1990s, and has chaired numerous IETF working groups. He was the founder of the Internet Mail Consortium and the Virtual Private Network Consortium. He is currently a technologist at ICANN.

== Writer ==
He has authored popular books on technical topics, including Perl for Dummies and Netscape Communicator for Dummies.

He was news editor at MicroTimes from 1985 to 1994.

== RFCs ==
He is the author or co-author of over 80 Requests for Comments (RFCs).

== See also ==
- List of RFCs
