= SunRocket =

SunRocket, Inc.
- Original SunRocket logo
- Industry: VoIP phone service
- Founded: 2004
- Defunct: 2007-07-16
- Fate: Ceased operations
- Headquarters: Vienna, Virginia, United States
- Key people: Joyce Dorris, CMO & Co-founder; Paul Erickson, Chairman & Co-founder

SunRocket was an American VoIP provider established in early 2004 by Joyce Dorris and Paul Erickson, former MCI executives. Sunrocket was one of several companies to offer an inexpensive telephone service that competed against the traditional phone companies by using a broadband Internet connection instead of a regular (or analog) phone line.

Dorris and Erickson departed the company in February 2007 along with roughly 30 other employees based at SunRocket's corporate headquarters in Vienna, Virginia. Sunrocket ceased operations on July 3, 2007, at midnight.

On August 23, 2007, SunRocket filed a lawsuit against Vonage for violating a confidentiality agreement, by using SunRocket's customer lists. Vonage claims to have bought the customer lists from a third party, Paradysz Matera. In the complaint, SunRocket claims that Vonage has exposed them to privacy related lawsuits from customers.

In early 2009 the SunRocket.com domain and related trademarks were purchased from the estate of SunRocket, Inc. by a private equity firm in San Diego, California. As of mid-2011 the new firm is providing wireless and VoIP services, online and mobile gaming, on-demand video, and music streaming and downloading under the SunRocket name.
