= Voicemail =

Voice message storage and retrieval

A voicemail system (also known as voice message or voice bank) is a computer-based system that allows callers to leave a recorded message when the recipient has been unable (or unwilling) to answer the phone. Calls may be directed to voicemail manually or automatically. The caller is prompted to leave a message that the recipient can retrieve at a later time.

Voicemail can be used for personal calls, but more complex systems exist for companies and services to handle the volume of customer requests. The term is also used more broadly to denote any system of conveying stored telecommunications voice messages, including using older technology like answering machines.

== Features ==
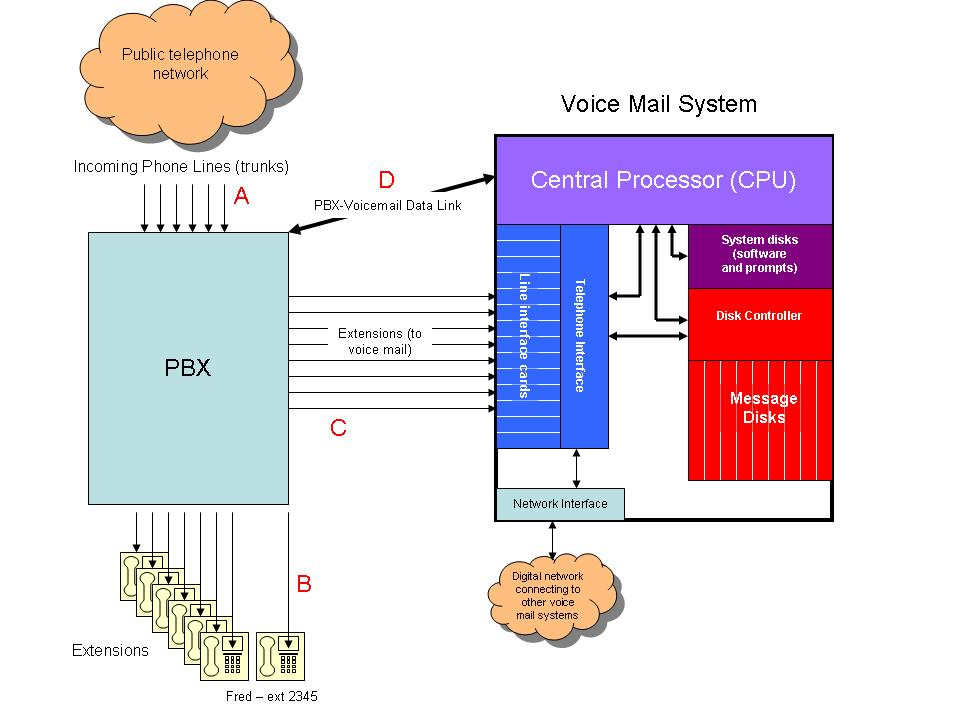
Drawing of how the voicemail system interacts with the PBX

Voicemail systems are designed to convey a caller's recorded audio message to a recipient. To do so, they contain a user interface to select, play, and manage messages; a delivery method to either play or otherwise deliver the message; and a notification ability to inform the user of a waiting message. Most systems use phone networks, either cellular- or landline-based, as the conduit for all of these functions. Some systems may use multiple telecommunications methods, permitting recipients and callers to retrieve or leave messages through multiple methods such as PCs or smartphones. On some phones, such as feature phones, the number 1 key is set up for auto-dialing voicemail.

Simple voicemail systems function as a remote answering machine using touch-tones as the user interface. More complicated systems may use other input devices such as voice or a computer interface. Simpler voicemail systems may play the audio message through the phone, while more advanced systems may have alternative delivery methods, including email or text message delivery, message transfer and forwarding options, and multiple mailboxes.

Almost all modern voicemail systems use digital storage and are typically stored on computer data storage. Notification methods also vary based on the voicemail system. Simple systems may not provide active notification at all, instead requiring the recipient to check with the system, while others may provide an indication that messages are waiting.

More advanced systems may be integrated with a company's Private Automated Branch Exchange (PABX), with a call center ACD for automatic call distribution; with mobile or paging terminals for message alert; and computer systems/data bases for delivering information or processing orders. Interactive voice response (IVR) systems may use digital information stored in a corporate data base to select pre-recorded words and phrases stored in a voicemail vocabulary to form sentences that are delivered to the caller.

== History ==
A common icon to represent voicemail (an abstraction of cassette tape, which were historically popular for use in voicemail recording before the 2000s)

The term Voicemail was coined by Televoice International (later Voicemail International, or VMI) for their introduction of the first US-wide Voicemail service in 1980. Although VMI trademarked the term, it eventually became a generic term for automated voice services employing a telephone. Voicemail popularity continues today with Internet telephone services such as Skype, Google Voice and ATT that integrate voice, voicemail and text services for tablets and smartphones.

Voicemail systems were developed in the late 1970s by Voice Message Exchange (VMX). They became popular in the early 1980s when they were made available on PC-based boards. In September 2012, a report from USA Today and Vonage claimed that voicemail was in decline. The report states that the number of voicemail messages declined eight percent compared to 2011.

=== Message centers ===
The conventional solution to efficient handling of telephone communication in businesses was the "message center". A message center or "message desk" was a centralized, manual answering service inside a company staffed by a few operators who answered all incoming phone calls. Extensions that were busy or rang "no answer" would forward to the message center using a device called a "call director". The call director had a button for each extension in the company which would flash when that person's extension forwarded to the message center. A little label next to the button told the operator the person being called.

While it was an improvement over basic multi-line systems, the message center had many disadvantages. Many calls would come in simultaneously at peak periods, such as lunch time, and operators were often busy. This left message attendants with little time to take each message accurately. Often, they were not familiar with employees' names and "buzzwords" and how to spell or pronounce them. Messages were scribbled on pink slips and distributed by the internal mail system and messages, often arrived at people's desks after lengthy delays, contained little content other than the caller's name and number, and were often inaccurate, with misspelled names and wrong phone numbers.

Tape-based telephone answering machines had come into the residential telephone market, but they were not used much in the corporate environment due to physical limitations of the technology. One answering machine was needed for each telephone; messages could not be recorded if the user was using the phone; messages had to be retrieved in sequential order; and messages could not be retrieved remotely, selectively discarded, saved, or forwarded to others. Further, the manufacturers of PBXs (private branch exchanges—the name for corporate phone systems) used proprietary digital phone sets in order to increase the functionality and value of the PBX. These phone sets were, by design, incompatible with answering machines.

In the 1970s and early 1980s, the cost of long-distance calling decreased and more business communications were conducted by telephone. As corporations grew and labor rates increased, the ratio of secretaries to employees decreased. With more communication by phone, multiple time zones, and fewer secretaries, real-time phone communications were hampered by callers being unable to reach people. Some early studies showed that only 1 in 4 phone calls resulted in a completed call and half the calls were one-way in nature (that is, they did not require a conversation). This happened because people were either not at work (due to time zone differences, being away on business, etc.), or if they were at work, they were on the phone, away from their desks in meetings, on breaks, etc. This bottleneck hindered the effectiveness of business activities and decreased both individual and group productivity. It also wasted the caller's time and created delays in resolving time-critical issues.

=== Invention ===
The first public records describing voice recording were reported in a New York newspaper and the Scientific American in November 1877. Thomas A. Edison had announced the invention of his "phonograph" saying "the object was to record telephone messages and transmit them again by telephone." Edison applied for a US patent in December 1877 and shortly thereafter demonstrated the machine to publishers, the US Congress and President Rutherford B. Hayes. In an article outlining his own ideas of the future usefulness of his machine Edison's list began with "Letter writing, and all kinds of dictation without the aid of a stenographer." In other words, "voice messages" or "Voice-mail". By 1914, Edison's phonograph business included a dictating machine (the Ediphone) and the "Telescribe", a machine combining the phonograph and the telephone, which recorded both sides of telephone conversations.

For nearly one hundred years, there were few innovations or advances in telephone services. Voicemail was the result of innovations in telephone products and services made possible by developments in computer technology during the 1970s. These innovations began with the Motorola Pageboy, a simple "pager" or "beeper" introduced in 1974 that was generally offered in conjunction with answering services that handled busy / no-answer overloads and after hours calls for businesses and professionals. Operators wrote down a caller's message, sent a page alert or "beep" and when the party called back, an operator dictated the message.

With the introduction of "voice" pagers, like the Motorola Pageboy II operators could transmit a voice message directly to the pager and the user could hear the message. However, messages arrival was often untimely and privacy issues, as well as the high cost, eventually caused the demise of these services. By the mid 1970s digital storage and analog to digital conversion devices had emerged and paging companies began handling client messages electronically. Operators recorded a short message (five to six seconds, e.g. "please call Mr. Smith") and the messages were delivered automatically when the client called the answering service. It would only take a short step for the first voicemail application to be born.

Computer manufacturers, telephone equipment manufacturers, and software firms began developing more sophisticated solutions as more powerful and less expensive computer processors and storage devices became available. This set the stage for a creation of a broad spectrum of computer based Central Office and Customer Premises Equipment that would eventually support enhanced voice solutions such as voicemail, audiotex, interactive voice response (IVR) and speech recognition solutions that began emerging in the 1980s. However, broad adoption of these products and services would depend on the global proliferation of touch tone phones and mobile phone services which would not occur until the late 1980s.

==== Inventor controversy ====
Many contributed to the creation of the modern-day voicemail. Legal battles ensued for decades. The true first inventor of voicemail, patent number 4,124,773 (Audio Storage and Distribution System), is Robin Elkins. "Though Elkins received a patent in 1978, telecommunications giants began offering voicemail without paying Elkins a penny in royalties." "Elkins never expected to spend 10 years of his life battling some of the world's largest corporations, either. But once he patented his system, he figured he should protect it." Later, Elkins successfully licensed his patented technology to IBM, DEC, and WANG, among many others. Unfortunately, his patent did not address simultaneity of voice message access and storage and the application for patent was filed after the patent application of the system patented by Kolodny and Hughes, as described below.

=== Early applications ===
One of the first modern day voicemail applications was invented by Gerald M. Kolodny and Paul Hughes, which was described in an article in the medical journal, Radiology (Kolodny GM, Cohen HI, Kalisky A. Rapid-access system for radiology reports: a new concept. Radiology. 1974;111(3):717–9) A patent was applied for by Kolodny and Hughes in 1975, prior to the patent applications of both Elkins and Matthews and was issued in 1981 (US patent 4,260,854). The patent was assigned to Sudbury Systems of Sudbury Massachusetts who proceeded to market and sell such systems to corporations and hospitals. IBM, Sony and Lanier, as well as several smaller makers of voicemail systems, licensed the Sudbury patent for their voicemail systems. A patent suit, brought by Pitney Bowes, claiming prior art to the Sudbury patent, was denied by the US District Court, District of Connecticut on November 8, 2000. A similar suit brought by VDI Technologies against the Kolodny and Hughes patent claiming prior art was dismissed by the US District Court in New Hampshire on December 19, 1991.

==== IBM Audio Distribution System ====
The first voice-messaging application, the Speech Filing System, was developed at the IBM Thomas J. Watson Research Center in 1973 under the leadership of Stephen Boies. It was later renamed the Audio Distribution System (ADS).

ADS used the human voice and the fixed-line touch-tone telephones that predated computer screens and mobile phones. The first operational prototypes were used by 750 IBM executives mainly in the US for their daily work. Those prototypes ran on an IBM System/7 computer attached to an IBM VM370 for additional storage.

In 1978 the prototype was converted to run on an IBM Series/1 computer. In September 1981 IBM started marketing ADS in America and Europe: the first customer installation was completed in February 1982.

ADS, marketed by IBM and briefly by AT&T Corporation, was well featured for voice messaging, the result of IBM's considerable human-factors research plus observation of operational use. Using a 1980s computer requiring air conditioning, it was expensive and physically large. With further development it grew to handle up to 3000 users, 100 hours of messages, multiple languages, message notification to a host computer, and 16 simultaneous users.

ADS could be connected to exchange lines and private exchanges including the IBM 2750 and 3750 Switching Systems available in Germany, France, Italy, Belgium, and the UK.

IBM sold many systems, Installations including the 1984 Los Angeles Olympic Games "Olympic Message System"

==== Delta 1 ====
Another company, Delphi Communications of California, deserves some partial credit for invention of voicemail. Delphi developed a proprietary system called Delta 1 that picked up and coming calls directly from the telephone company. Delphi presented the concept publicly to the association of Telephone Answering Services around 1973 and the prototype system was launched in San Francisco in 1976 by a Delphi company called VoiceBank. A patent was applied for and issued for Delphi's Automated Telephone Voice Service System. The patent, US Patent No. 4,625,081, was issued after Delphi's closure, but Delphi's assets (and the patent) were transferred to another Exxon company, Gilbarco, which made equipment for gas pumps at filling stations. Gilbarco is now owned by GEC in the United Kingdom.

==== AT&T ====
AT&T developed a system called 1A Voice Storage System to support custom services including voicemail for the public telephone system. It worked in conjunction with the companies 1A ESS and 5ESS systems. Development started in mid-1976, with first deployment in early 1979. Friendly user service started in March 1980. The service was terminated in 1981 as a result of the US FCC Computer Inquiry II, which prohibited enhanced services from being provided by the regulated network.

==== VMX ====
In 1979, a company was founded in Texas by Gordon Matthews called ECS Communications (the name was later changed to VMX, for Voice Message exchange). VMX developed a 3000-user voice messaging system called the VMX/64. Matthews, a prolific entrepreneur and patentor, applied for and was granted a patent on voicemail (patent number 4,371,752) which issued in February 1983. The patent was promoted as the pioneering patent for voicemail. However, the patent application was filed on November 26, 1979, five years after, and issued in 1983.

VMX asserted infringement first with IBM, AT&T and then Wang, but all three companies reportedly would have been able to invalidate the patent on the basis of prior art and their licenses from Sudbury Systems Inc, for their Kolodny and Hughes patent.

==== IVR Voice Recognition ====
In 1985, Voice Response Inc. (formerly Call-It Co) a subsidiary of Lee Enterprises, Davenport IA, entered the fast-growing Interactive Voice (IVR) response market under the direction of Bob Ross, President. About a year later, VRI introduced one of the first "successful" IVR applications that utilized voice recognition (rather than touch tone) to capture caller responses. Voice recognition technology had great difficulty with regional and ethnic differences and nuances which resulted in a high incidence of error. VRI discovered that hesitation (delayed response) signaled caller confusion or misunderstanding which often resulted in an inaccurate response. VRI developed proprietary techniques that measured user response times and used the data to make real-time changes to the application's dialog with the caller. VRI found that the confidence level of a "suspect" caller response could be increased by asking "Did you say (Chicago), Yes or No", a standard question heard in order taking or reservation making IVR applications today. VRI pioneering applications, including subscription fulfillment for Time and Life magazines, proved faster and less expensive than call centers using live operators and although VRI did not survive, their voice recognition processes became industry standards and VRI's patent USPTO – patent RE34,587 was eventually licensed by Intel/Dialogic and Nuance.

==== PC-based Voicemail ====
Amidst the booming popularity of the IBM PC-AT, a variety of companies popped up to market add-in boards to the AT. These companies aimed to use the PC as an inexpensive hardware platform for hosting add-in boards and software providing voice mail functionality for small businesses that wanted something more sophisticated than an answering machine but could not afford pricey conventional voice mail solutions. Among these was The Complete PC, founded in 1986 in Silicon Valley. The Complete PC was sold to publicly listed Florida-based Boca Research Inc., in 1993.

== International Voicemail Association ==
In 1987, voicemail service providers in the US and Europe joined to form the Voice Mail Association of Europe (VMA) with René Beusch, Radio-Suisse and Paul Finnigan, Finnigan USA serving as VMA Chairman and President respectively. The first VMA meeting was held in Stockholm Huddinge by Voicemail Svenska AB in 1987, organized by its founder Lars Olof Kanngard. The tech team in Voicemail Svenska AB was granted the right to port the Voicemail from PDP systems to their own PC-board solution, which become known as the MiniVoice, later become ESSELTE VOICE AB. The VMA invited service providers, vendors and consultants to attend semi-annual conferences that included presentations, discussions and reporting of experiences. VMA membership was eventually expanded to include representatives from telecommunication organizations worldwide and became "The International Voice-mail Association". By the late 1980s, the Bell Operating companies, Tigon and other independent service providers in the US had joined the VMA. In 1992, VMA members conducted an "Information Week Tour of the U.S.", sharing ideas with major telecom operators. VMA working groups promoted collaboration and adoption of industry standards to the ITU and CCITT and at the 1999 CCITT conference in Geneva, Switzerland, demonstrated worldwide exchange of messages between the major voicemail vendors' platforms using the VPIM networking standard. Beusch and Finnigan led the VMA until 1998 and 1999 respectively and the organization continues to serve the voice services industry today.

== Public telephone services ==
In the US, the Bell Operating Companies and their cellular divisions had been prohibited by the FCC from offering voicemail and other enhanced services such as paging and telephone answering services (no such prohibition existed in foreign countries). A ruling by Judge Harold H. Greene on March 7, 1988, removed this barrier and allowed the BOCs to offer voicemail service, however, they were not allowed to design or manufacture equipment used to provide voicemail services.

The opportunity created by the Greene decision, plus Voicemail International's abandonment of its market lead for carrier-grade systems, created a new opportunity for competing manufacturers and those who had been focusing on the corporate market. Unisys, Boston Technology, and Comverse Technology were quick to address the BOC and PTT marketplace. Octel, who had high capacity systems in use internally by all seven Regional Bell Operating companies, launched a new generation of its large system specifically designed for carriers and was compliant with "NEBS standards", the tight standard required by phone companies for any equipment located in their central offices.

== Unified messaging ==
Unified Messaging integrated voicemail into Microsoft Exchange, the corporate email system made by Microsoft. Unified Messaging had been invented by Roberta Cohen, Kenneth Huber and Deborah Mill at AT&T Bell Labs. The patent for Unified Messaging was received in June 1989 (Patent number 4,837,798).

Unified Messaging allowed users to access voicemail and email messages using either the graphical user interface (GUI) on their PC, or using the telephone user interface (TUI). For voicemail, they'd see the "header information" (sender, date sent, size, and subject). Users could double-click a voicemail from their email inbox and hear the message through their PC or a phone next to their desk. Voice messages could be sent using email or telephone addressing schemes, and the data networking infrastructure was used to send messages between locations rather than the public switched telephone network.

== Virtual telephony ==
Other interesting markets developed from the carrier market including a concept called "virtual telephony". Virtual Telephony, developed by Octel, used voicemail to provide phone service rapidly in emerging countries without wiring for telephones. The problem this solved was that emerging countries did not have many telephones. Wiring for telephones was very expensive, and many poorer citizens did not have homes to wire. The economies of emerging countries were held back partly because people could not communicate beyond the area where they could walk or ride a bicycle. Giving them phones was one way to help their economies, but there was not a practical way to do it. In some countries, the wait for a phone was several years and the cost was in the thousands of dollars. Cellular phones were not an option at the time because they were extremely expensive (thousands of dollars per handset) and the infrastructure to install cell sites was also costly.

With virtual telephony, each person could be given a phone number (just the number, not the phone) and a voice mailbox. The citizen would also be given a pager. If someone called the phone number, it never rang on an actual phone, but would be routed immediately to a central voicemail system. The voicemail system answered the call and the caller could leave a long, detailed message. As soon as the message was received, the voicemail system would trigger the citizen's pager. When the page was received, the citizen would find a pay phone and call in to pick up the message. This concept was used successfully in South America and South Africa.

== Instant messaging in voice ==
By 2000, voicemail was a feature on corporate, cellular, and residential telephone systems. Cellular and residential voicemail remain in use, primarily for automated telephone answering. Email was widely used as a messaging system, supported by server infrastructure and the use of multimedia desktop computers among office workers.

The expansion of wireless mobility, initially through cellular services and later through IP-based Wi-Fi, is associated with the convergence of messaging with mobile telephony. As of April 2026, this includes the use of speech user interfaces for message management and the integration of voice message retrieval with email. Systems support responses to voice and email messages using voice-based formats. Services such as GotVoice, SpinVox, and YouMail convert voicemails into SMS text messages.

A related technique known as ringless voicemail, also called direct-to-voicemail or voicemail drop - delivers a pre-recorded message directly to a recipient's mailbox without the recipient's phone ringing. It is used for marketing, political outreach, and bulk notifications, and in the United States it is subject to the Telephone Consumer Protection Act following a 2022 Federal Communications Commission declaratory ruling.

The next development in messaging was in making text messaging real-time, rather than just asynchronous store-and-forward delivery into a mailbox. Although in the 1980s Minitel in France was extremely popular and Teletext was widely used in the US, instant messaging on the Internet began with the ICQ application developed in 1996 as a public Internet-based free text "chat" service for consumers, but soon was being used by business people as well. It introduced the concept of Internet Protocol "presence management" or being able to detect device connectivity to the Internet and contact recipient "availability" status to exchange real-time messages, as well as personalized "Buddy list" directories to allow only people you knew to find out your status and initiate a real-time text messaging exchange with you. Presence and Instant Messaging has since evolved into more than short text messages, but now can include the exchange of data files (documents, pictures) and the escalation of the contact into a voice conversational connection.

== Unified messaging with VoIP ==
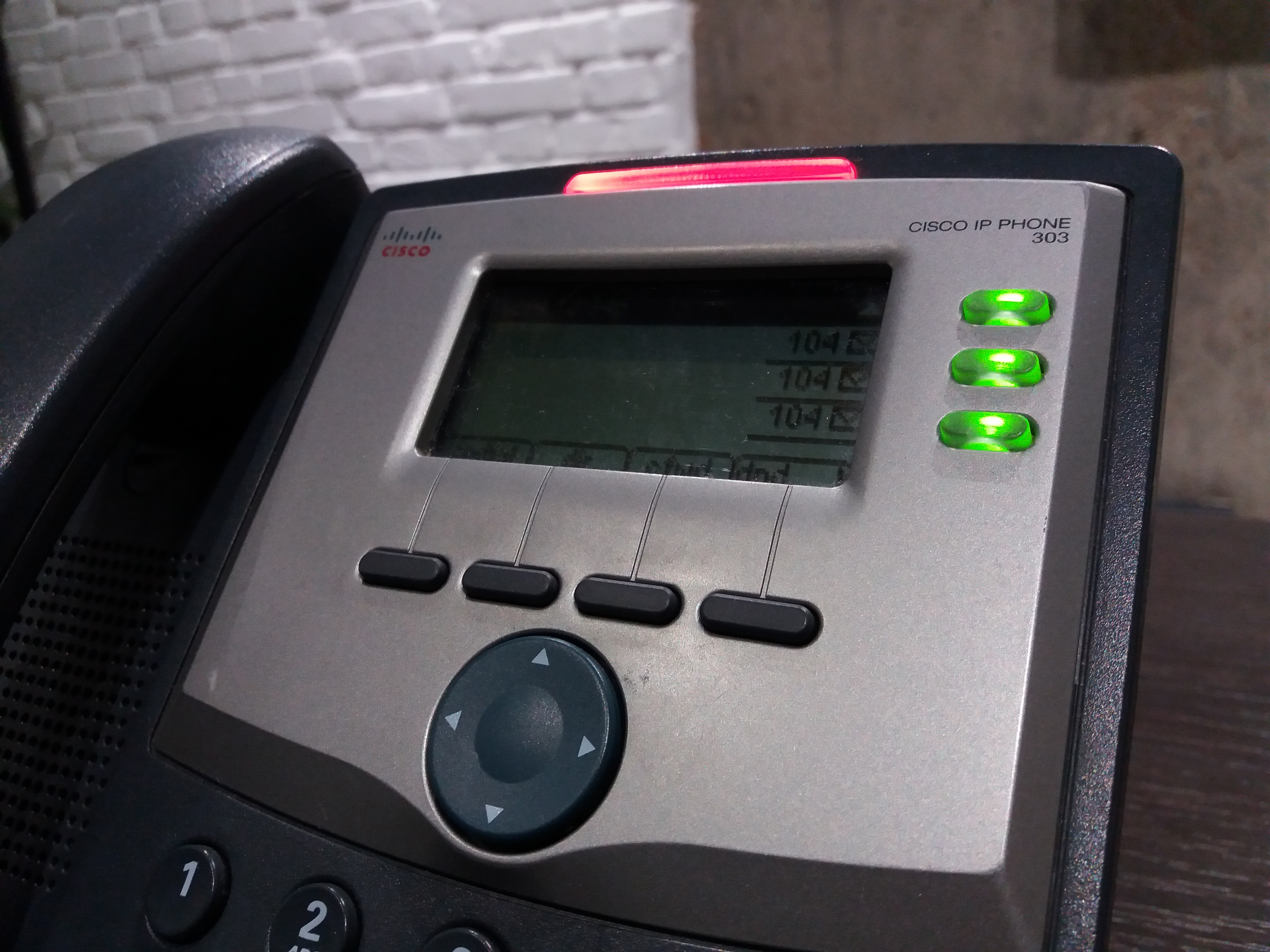
Voicemail indication

Corporate voicemail did not change much until the advent of Voice over IP (VoIP—voice being transmitted over the internet) and the development of Internet Protocol (IP) telephony applications to replace legacy PBX telephony (called TDM technologies). IP telephony changed the style and technology of PBXs and the way voicemail systems integrated with them. This, in turn, facilitated a new generation of Unified Messaging, which is now likely to catch on widely. The flexibility, manageability, lower costs, reliability, speed, and user convenience for messaging convergence is now possible where it was not before. This might include intra- and inter-enterprise contacts, mobile contacts, proactive application information delivery, and customer contact applications.

The corporate IP telephony-based voicemail customer premises equipment market is served by several vendors including Avaya, Cisco systems, Adomo, Interactive Intelligence, Nortel, Mitel, 3Com, and AVST. Their marketing strategy will have to address the need to support a variety of legacy PBXs as well as new Voice over IP as enterprises migrate towards converging IP-based telecommunications. A similar situation exists for the carrier market for voicemail servers, currently dominated by Comverse Technology, with some share still held by Lucent Technologies.

VoIP telephony enables centralized, shared servers, with remote administration and usage management for corporate (enterprise) customers. In the past, carriers lost this business because it was far too expensive and inflexible to have remote managed facilities by the phone company. With VoIP, remote administration is far more economical. This technology has re-opened opportunities for carriers to offer hosted, shared services for all forms of converged IP telecommunications, including IP-PBX and voicemail services. Because of the convergence of wired and wireless communications, such services may also include support of a variety of multi-modal handheld and desktop end user devices. This service, when offered for multiple extensions or phone numbers is sometimes also called Unified Voice-mail.

== See also ==
- IP telephony
- Visual voicemail
