= Lifesize =

American telecommunications company

- Founded: January 2003; 23 years ago (as KMV Technologies); Austin, Texas, U.S.
- Founders: Craig Malloy; Michael Kenoyer
- Headquarters: Austin, Texas, US
- Key people: Trent Waterhouse, CEO
- Products: Lifesize Cloud, Lifesize Icon Series, Lifesize Phone HD, CxEngage, CxConcierge
- Number of employees: 200+
- Website: Lifesize

Lifesize was a video and audio telecommunications company in the United States which provided high definition videoconferencing endpoints and accessories, touchscreen conference room phones, a cloud-based video collaboration platform, and omnichannel contact center solutions under their CxEngage product line. Lifesize's headquarters was located in Austin, Texas. Its Europe, Middle East and Africa regional office were located in Munich, Germany.

== History ==
Lifesize was founded by Craig Malloy and Michael Kenoyer in January 2003. It operated in "stealth mode" under the name KMV Technologies from 2003 to 2005. Investors in Lifesize included Redpoint Ventures, Sutter Hill Ventures, Pinnacle Ventures, Austin Ventures, Norwest Venture Partners and Tenaya Capital. The company name change to Lifesize Communications was unveiled at the Interop trade show in Las Vegas, Nevada in May 2005. This is also when Lifesize announced its first product, Lifesize Room, which was the first high definition video conferencing endpoint brought to market.

Malloy was a product manager at VTEL Corporation until 1996, when he left and founded ViaVideo. ViaVideo was acquired by Polycom in 1998. Malloy was the senior vice president and general manager of the Video Communication Division of Polycom through 2002, when he left to found his own high definition video telecommunications company.

In 2009, Logitech acquired Lifesize for US$405 million in cash. Lifesize then became a division of Logitech, but continued to operate as a separate division led by Malloy. Malloy served as the Lifesize CEO from 2003 – 2012, and resumed the role in February 2014.

Lifesize was spun out of Logitech in early 2016 and is privately owned.

In March 2020, Lifesize announced a merger with Serenova, a contact center-as-a-service (CCaaS) provider.

In August 2020, Lifesize announced the acquisition of Kaptivo, a digital collaboration company based in Cambridge, UK.

In February 2021, former 8x8 President, Kim Niederman was appointed CEO.

In 2023, Lifesize launched CxConcierge, a live customer service solution that allows companies to offer instant customer support assistance via on-demand video calls.

On May 17, 2023, Lifesize filed for Chapter 11 bankruptcy. LifeSize's assets were partially sold to Enghouse Systems, a Canadian, publicly traded technology services company which has rolled up other older video conferencing businesses and related services, such as Vidyo. Lifesize converted their case to a Chapter 7 bankruptcy liquidation on October 10, 2023.

== Technology ==
LifeSize was the first company to bring real time, high definition videoconferencing to market. With the introduction of the Cisco TelePresence product LifeSize through its partners also competed in telepresence. The company brought their first video conferencing "codec" to market in 2005, called LifeSize Room.

Lifesize product portfolio includes high definition endpoints and accessories, NAT/firewall traversal, touchscreen conference room phones, ISDN gateways, Multipoint Control Units and management systems, as well as mobile video conferencing software and a cloud-based IaaS offering for video conferencing. Lifesize also offers a recording and sharing service called Lifesize Cloud Amplify. In 2016, Lifesize brought huddle room systems to the market with Smartframing camera technology embedded.

LifeSize's technology was very advanced for its time. In order to deliver high definition, live video conferencing at the time LifeSize utilized parts from Texas Instruments, Phillips Semiconductor, and Broadcom. Encoding and decoding had to be accomplished by entirely different silicone. The products were very expensive in their first release, with the first LifeSize Room priced at over $12,000 USD LifeSize also had to develop its own image pipeline for its cameras, even designing the entire camera itself from the sensor up.

== See also ==
- Videoconferencing
- Telecollaboration
- Teleconference
- Videotelephony
