= Unified communications =

Business and marketing concept

Unified communications (UC) is a business and marketing concept that integrates multiple enterprise communication services. These include instant messaging, presence information, IP telephony, mobility features, audio/video/web conferencing, desktop and data sharing, call control, and speech recognition. UC also links with non-real-time services such as unified messaging (integrated voicemail, e-mail, SMS, and fax). UC is not necessarily a single product, but a set of products that provides a consistent unified user interface and user experience across multiple devices and media types.

In its broadest sense, the UC can encompass all forms of communications that are exchanged via a network to include other forms of communications such as Internet Protocol television (IPTV) and digital signage as they become an integrated part of the network communications deployment and may be directed as one-to-one communications or broadcast communications from one to many.

UC allows an individual to send a message on one medium and receive the same communication on another medium. For example, one can receive a voicemail message and choose to access it through e-mail or a cell phone. If the sender is online according to the presence information and currently accepts calls, the response can be sent immediately through text chat or a video call. Otherwise, it may be sent as a non-real-time message that can be accessed through a variety of media.

== Definition ==
There are varying definitions for unified communications. A basic definition is "communications integrated to optimize business processes and increase user productivity", but such integration can take many forms, such as: users simply adjusting their habits, manual integration as defined by procedures and training, integration of communications into off-the-shelf tools such as Thunderbird, Outlook, Lotus Notes, BlackBerry, Salesforce.com, etc., or purpose-specific integration into customized applications in specific operating departments or in vertical markets such as healthcare.

Unified communications is an evolving set of technologies that automates and unifies human and device communications in a common context and experience. It optimizes business processes and enhances human communications by reducing latency, managing flows, and eliminating device and media dependencies. A UC system may include features such as messaging, voice and video calls, meetings, team collaboration, file sharing, and integrated apps.

== History ==
The history of unified communications is tied to the evolution of the supporting technology. Originally, business telephone systems were a private branch exchange (PBX) or key telephone system provided and managed by the local phone company. These systems used the phone company's analog or digital circuits to deliver phone calls from a central office (CO) to the customer. The system —PBX or key telephone system— accepted the call and routed the call to the appropriate extension or line appearance on the phones at the customer's office.

In the 1980s, voice mail systems with IVR-like features were recognized as an access mechanism to corporate information for mobile employees, before the explosion of cell phones and the proliferation of PCs. E-mail also began to grow in popularity, and as early as 1985, e-mail reading features were made available for certain voicemail.

The term unified communications arose in the mid-1990s, when messaging and real-time communications began to combine. In 1993, ThinkRite (VoiceRite) developed the unified messaging system, POET, for IBM's internal use. It was installed in 55 IBM US Branch Offices for 54,000 employees and integrated with IBM OfficeVision/VM (PROFS) and provided IBMers with one phone number for voicemail, fax, alphanumeric paging and follow-me. POET was in use until 2000. In the late 1990s, a New Zealand-based organization called IPFX developed a commercially available presence product, which let users see the location of colleagues, make decisions on how to contact them, and define how their messages were handled based on their own presence. The first full-featured converged telephony/UC offering was the Nortel Succession MX (Multimedia eXchange) product, which later became known as Nortel Multimedia Communications Server (MCS 5100).

The major drawback to this service was the reliance on the phone company or vendor partner to manage (in most cases) the PBX or key telephone system. This resulted in a residual, recurring cost to customers. Over time, the PBX became more privatized, and internal staff members were hired to manage these systems. This was typically done by companies that could afford to bring this skill in-house and thereby reduce the requirement to notify the phone company or their local PBX vendor each time a change was required in the system. This increasing privatization triggered the development of more powerful software that increased the usability and manageability of the system.

As companies began to deploy IP networks in their environment, companies began to use these networks to transmit voice instead of relying on traditional telephone network circuits. Some vendors such as Avaya and Nortel created circuit packs or cards for their PBX systems that could interconnect their communications systems to the IP network. Other vendors such as Cisco created equipment that could be placed in routers to transport voice calls across a company network from site to site. The termination of PBX circuits to be transported across a network and delivered to another phone system is traditionally referred to as Voice over IP (Voice over Internet Protocol or VoIP). This design required special hardware on both ends of the network equipment to provide the termination and delivery at each site. As time went by, Siemens, Alcatel-Lucent, Cisco, Nortel, Avaya, Wildix and Mitel realized the potential for eliminating the traditional PBX or key system and replacing it with a solution based on IP. This IP solution is software driven only, and thereby does away with the need for "switching" equipment at a customer site (save the equipment necessary to connect to the outside world). This created a new technology, now called IP telephony. A system that uses IP-based telephony services only, rather than a legacy PBX or key system, is called an IP telephony solution.

With the advent of IP telephony the handset was no longer a digital device hanging off a copper loop from a PBX. Instead, the handset lived on the network as another computer device. The transport of audio was therefore no longer a variation in voltages or modulation of frequency such as with the handsets from before, but rather encoding the conversation using a codec (G.711 originally) and transporting it with a protocol such as the Real-time Transport Protocol (RTP). When the handset is just another computer connected to the network, advanced features can be provided by letting computer applications communicate with server computers elsewhere in any number of ways; applications can even be upgraded or freshly installed on the handset.

When considering the efforts of Unified Communications solutions providers, the overall goal is to no longer focus strictly on the telephony portion of daily communications. The unification of all communication devices inside a single platform provides the mobility, presence, and contact capabilities that extend beyond the phone to all devices a person may use or have at their disposal.

Given the wide scope of unified communications, there has been a lack of community definition as most solutions are from proprietary vendors. Since March 2008, there are several open source projects with a UC focus such as Druid and Elastix, which are based on Asterisk, a leading open source telephony project. The aim of these open source UC projects is to allow the open source community of developers and users to have a say in unified communications and what it means.

IBM entered the unified communications marketplace with several products, beginning in 2006 with the updated release of a unified communications middleware platform, IBM Lotus Sametime 7.5, as well as related products and services such as IBM WebSphere Unified Messaging, IBM Global Technology Services - Converged Communications Services, and more. In October 2007, Microsoft entered the UC market with the launch of Office Communications Server, a software-based application running on Windows. In March 2008, Unison Technologies launched Unison, a software-based unified communications solution that runs on Linux and Windows.

In May 2010, the Unified Communications Interoperability Forum (UCIF) was announced. UCIF is an independent, non-profit alliance between technology companies that creates and tests interoperability profiles, implementation guidelines, and best practices for interoperability between UC products and existing communications and business applications. The original founding members were HP, Juniper Networks, Logitech / LifeSize, Microsoft, and Polycom.

There is some debate about whether unified communications hosted on an enterprise's premises is the same thing as unified communications solutions that are hosted by a service provider, or UCaaS (UC as a Service). While both offer their respective advantages, all of these approaches can be grouped under the single umbrella category of unified communications.

== Technology ==
=== Contrasting unified messaging ===
Unified communications is sometimes confused with unified messaging, but it is distinct. Unified communications refers to both real-time and non-real-time delivery of communications based on the preferred method and location of the recipient; unified messaging culls messages from several sources (such as e-mail, voice mail and faxes), but holds those messages only for retrieval at a later time. Unified communications allows for an individual to check and retrieve an e-mail or voice mail from any communication device at any time. It expands beyond voice mail services to data communications and video services.

=== Components ===
With unified communications, multiple modes of business communications are integrated. Unified communications is not a single product but a collection of elements that includes:

- Call control and multimodal communications
- Presence
- Instant messaging
- Unified messaging
- Speech access and personal assistant
- Conferencing (audio, Web and video)
- Collaboration tools
- Mobility
- Business process integration (BPI)
- Software to enable business process integration

Presence—knowing where intended recipients are, and if they are available, in real time—is a key component of unified communications. Unified communications integrates all systems a user might already use, and helps those systems work together in real time. For example, unified communications technology could allow a user to seamlessly collaborate with another person on a project, even if the two users are in separate locations. The user could quickly locate the necessary person by accessing an interactive directory, engage in a text messaging session, and then escalate the session to a voice call, or even a video call.

In another example, an employee receives a call from a customer who wants answers. Unified communications enables that employee to call an expert colleague from a real-time list. This way, the employee can answer the customer faster by eliminating rounds of back-and-forth e-mails and phone-tag.

The examples in the previous paragraph primarily describe "personal productivity" enhancements that tend to benefit the individual user. While such benefits can be important, enterprises are finding that they can achieve even greater impact by using unified communications capabilities to transform business processes. This is achieved by integrating UC functionality directly into the business applications using development tools provided by many of the suppliers. Instead of the individual user invoking the UC functionality to, say, find an appropriate resource, the workflow or process application automatically identifies the resource at the point in the business activity where one is needed.

When used in this manner, the concept of presence often changes. Most people associate presence with instant messaging (IM "buddy lists") the status of individuals is identified. But, in many business process applications, what is important is finding someone with a certain skill. In these environments, presence identifies available skills or capabilities.

This "business process" approach to integrating UC functionality can result in bottom line benefits that are an order of magnitude greater than those achievable by personal productivity methods alone.

== Related concepts ==
Unified communications & collaboration (UCC) is the integration of various communications methods with collaboration tools such as virtual white boards, real-time audio and video conferencing, and enhanced call control capabilities. Before this fusion of communications and collaboration tools into a single platform, enterprise collaboration service vendors and enterprise communications service vendors offered distinctly different solutions. Now, collaboration service vendors also offer communications services, and communications service providers have developed collaboration tools.

Unified communications & collaboration as a service (UCCaaS) is cloud-based UCC platforms. Compared to premises-based UCC solutions, UCCaaS platforms offer enhanced flexibility and scalability due to the SaaS subscription model.

Unified communications provisioning is the act of entering and configuring the settings for users of phone systems, instant messaging, telepresence, and other collaboration channels. Provisioners refer to this process as making moves, adds, changes, and deletes or MAC-Ds.

== See also ==
- Intelligent network service
- Unified communications management
- Unified communications as a service (UCaaS)
- Mobile collaboration
- Telepresence
- Unified messaging
