= Unified messaging =

Unified messaging (or UM) is a business term for the integration of different electronic messaging and communications media (e-mail, SMS, fax, voicemail, video messaging, etc.) technologies into a single interface, accessible from a variety of different devices. While traditional communications systems delivered messages into several different types of stores such as voicemail systems, e-mail servers, and stand-alone fax machines, with Unified Messaging all types of messages are stored in one system. Voicemail messages, for example, can be delivered directly into the user's inbox and played either through a headset or the computer's speaker. This simplifies the user's experience (only one place to check for messages) and can offer new options for workflow such as appending notes or documents to forwarded voicemails.

Unified messaging is increasingly accepted in the corporate environment, where it's generally seen as an improvement to business productivity. Unified messaging for professional settings integrates communications processes into the existing IT infrastructure, i. e. into CRM, ERP and mail systems.

== Hype ==
Definitions of unified messaging vary from the typical definition of simple inclusion of incoming faxes and voice-mail in one's email inbox, all the way to dictating a message into a cell phone and the intelligent delivery of that message to the intended recipient in a variety of possible formats like text email, fax, or voice recording. Because of the nebulous definition of UM, it was number one on the 1998 Wired Magazine "Hype List".

== Difference from unified communications ==
Unified messaging is not to be mistaken for unified communications (UC), although the two share some similarities. UM is a component of UC which involves the integration of various communication channels, such as email, voicemail, and fax, into a single platform. This streamlines the management of messages, providing users with a centralized interface for handling diverse communication types.

In contrast, UC encompasses a broader spectrum of services, extending beyond messaging to include real-time communication tools, collaboration platforms, and other integrated applications. However, it's essential to note that not all unified communication services incorporate unified messaging. The distinction arises from the specific needs and preferences of hosted SMB customers. So while unified messaging can be included in unified communications, not all unified communication services are related to unified messaging.

== See also ==
- Real time enterprise
- Presence service
- Unified communications
